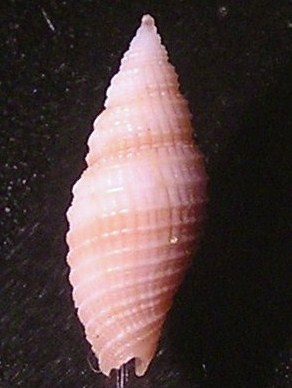
- Scabricola padangensis

Scientific classification
- Kingdom: Animalia
- Phylum: Mollusca
- Class: Gastropoda
- Subclass: Caenogastropoda
- Order: Neogastropoda
- Superfamily: Mitroidea
- Family: Mitridae
- Subfamily: Imbricariinae
- Genus: Scabricola; Swainson, 1840

Synonyms
- Mitra (Scabricola) Swainson, 1840 (original rank); Scabricola (Scabricola) Swainson, 1840

= Scabricola =

Genus of gastropods

Scabricola is a genus of sea snails, marine gastropod mollusks in the family Mitridae.

== Description ==
The shell is rough, with transverse, elevated ridges and longitudinal striae. The suture is not coronated. The aperture is effuse. The outer lip is crenate.

== Species ==
Species within the genus Scabricola include:

- Scabricola alabaster (Sowerby, 1900) (taxon inquirendum)
- Scabricola albina (A. Adams, 1853)
- Scabricola backae Cernohorsky, 1973
- Scabricola barrywilsoni (J. Cate, 1968)
- Scabricola bicolor (Swainson, 1824)
- Scabricola boswellae (J. Cate, 1964)
- Scabricola caerulea (Reeve, 1844)
- Scabricola condei Guillot de Suduiraut, 2001
- Scabricola coriacea (Reeve, 1845)
- Scabricola dampierensis Salisbury & Heinicke, 1998
- Scabricola desetangsii (Kiener, 1838)
- Scabricola dianneae (Salisbury & Guillot de Suduiraut, 2003)
- Scabricola eximia (A. Adams, 1853)
- Scabricola geigeri Poppe, Tagaro & Salisbury, 2009
- Scabricola gilbertsoni (J. Cate, 1968)
- Scabricola guttata (Swainson, 1824)
- Scabricola hayashii (Kira, 1959)
- Scabricola incisa (A. Adams & Reeve, 1850)
- Scabricola ivanmarrowi Marrow, 2016
- Scabricola lavoisieri Guillot de Suduiraut, 2002
- Scabricola lorenzi (Poppe & Tagaro, 2006)
- Scabricola mariae (A. Adams, 1853)
- Scabricola martini Poppe & Tagaro, 2006
- Scabricola olivaeformis (Swainson, 1821)
- Scabricola padangensis (Thiele, 1925)
- †Scabricola osapiensis (Koperberg, 1931)
- Scabricola parkinsoni Salisbury & Wolff, 2005
- Scabricola petiti Poppe & Tagaro, 2006
- Scabricola phoenix S.-I Huang & Q.-Y. Chuo, 2019
- Scabricola potensis (Montrouzier, 1858)
- Scabricola sowerbyi (d'Orbigny, 1852)
- Scabricola splendidula Salisbury & Guillot de Suduiraut, 2003
- Scabricola tenax S.-I Huang & Q.-Y. Chuo, 2019
- Scabricola variegata (Gmelin, 1791)
- Scabricola vicdani Cernohorsky, 1981
- Scabricola yaekoae (Habe & Kosuge, 1966)

Species brought into synonymy

- Scabricola biconica Bozzetti, 2011 accepted as Swainsonia biconica (Bozzetti, 2011) (original combination)
- Scabricola casta (Gmelin, 1791): synonym of Swainsonia casta (Gmelin, 1791)
- Scabricola fissurata (Lamarck, 1811): synonym of Swainsonia fissurata (Lamarck, 1811)
- Scabricola fusca (Swainson, 1824): synonym of Swainsonia fusca (Swainson, 1824)
- Scabricola gorii: synonym of Pterygia gorii (Turner, 2007)
- Scabricola granatina: synonym of Domiporta granatina (Lamarck, 1811)
- Scabricola interlirata (Reeve, 1844) accepted as Imbricaria interlirata (Reeve, 1844)
- Scabricola lugubris (Swainson, 1821) accepted as Strigatella lugubris (Swainson, 1821)
- Scabricola juttinga Koperberg, 1931: synonym of Gemmulimitra duplilirata (Reeve, 1845)
- Scabricola newcombii (Pease, 1869): synonym of Swainsonia newcombii (Pease, 1869)
- Scabricola ocellata (Swainson, 1831): synonym of Swainsonia ocellata (Swainson, 1831)
- Scabricola scabriuscula: synonym of Neocancilla papilio (Link, 1807)
