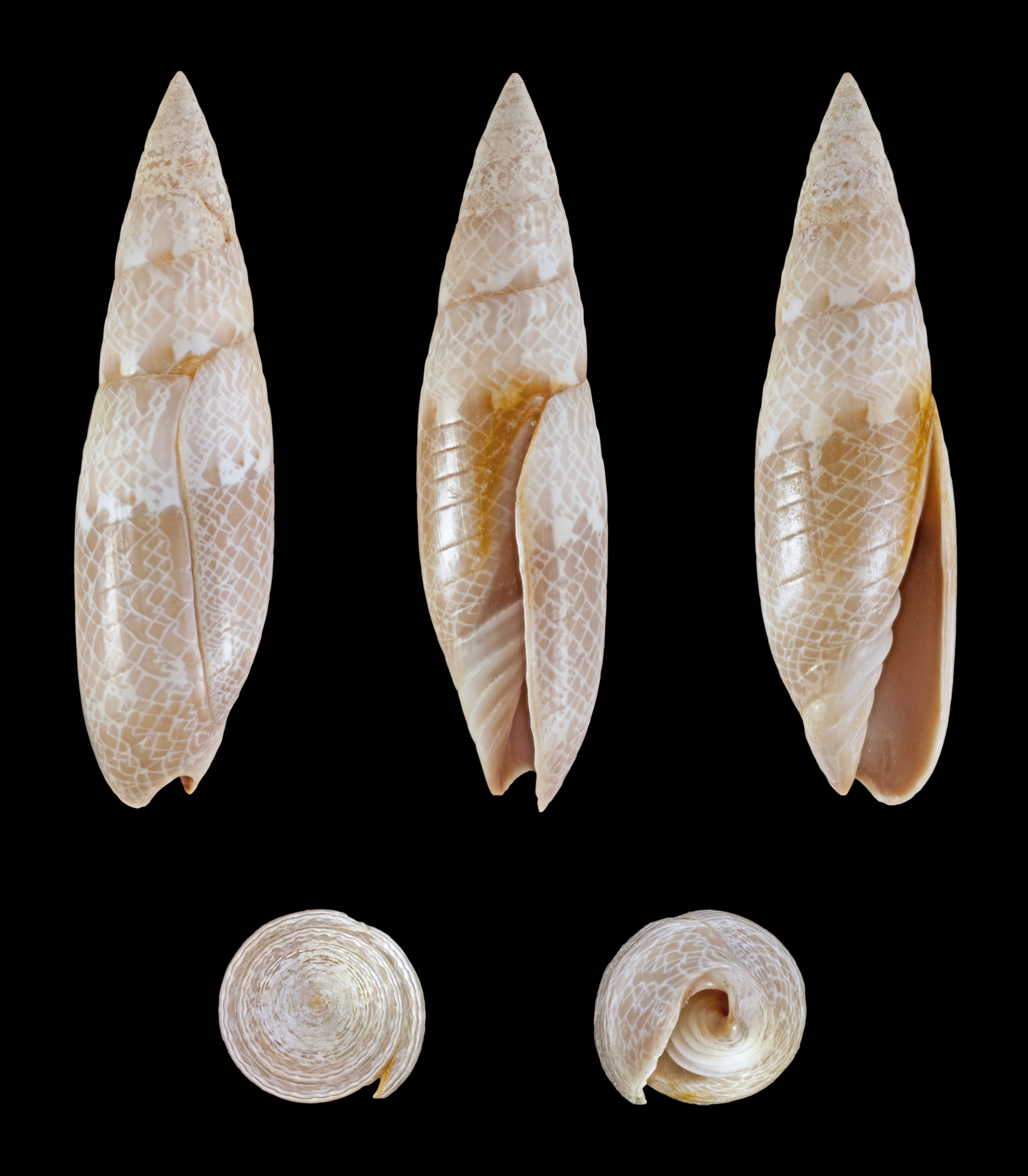
- Swainsonia fissurata shells

Scientific classification
- Kingdom: Animalia
- Phylum: Mollusca
- Class: Gastropoda
- Subclass: Caenogastropoda
- Order: Neogastropoda
- Family: Mitridae
- Subfamily: Imbricariinae
- Genus: Swainsonia; H. Adams & A. Adams, 1853

Type species
- Mitra fissurata Lamarck, 1811

Synonyms
- Cylindra (Swainsonia) H. Adams & A. Adams, 1853 (original rank); Mitrella Swainson, 1831 (invalid: junior homonym of Mitrella Risso, 1826 [Columbellidae]; Swainsonia is a replacement name); Scabricola (Swainsonia) H. Adams & A. Adams, 1853

= Swainsonia =

Genus of gastropods

Swainsonia is a genus of sea snails, marine gastropod molluscs in the subfamily Imbricariinae of the family Mitridae.

== Species ==
Species within the genus Swainsonia include:

- Swainsonia biconica (Bozzetti, 2011)
- Swainsonia casta (Gmelin, 1791)
- Swainsonia ekerae (Cernohorsky, 1973)
- Swainsonia fissurata Lamarck
- Swainsonia fusca (Swainson, 1824)
- Swainsonia limata (Reeve, 1845)
- Swainsonia newcombii (Pease, 1869)
- Swainsonia ocellata (Swainson, 1831)

Species brought into synonymy

- Swainsonia albina (A. Adams, 1853): synonym of Scabricola albina (A. Adams, 1853)
- Swainsonia bicolor (Swainson, 1824): synonym of Scabricola bicolor (Swainson, 1824)
- Swainsonia cloveri (Cernohorsky, 1971): synonym of Imbricaria cloveri (Cernohorsky, 1971)
- Swainsonia incisa (A. Adams & Reeve, 1850): synonym of Scabricola incisa (A. Adams & Reeve, 185o)
- Swainsonia mariae (A. Adams, 1853): synonym of Scabricola mariae (A. Adams, 1853)
- Swainsonia millepunctata (Schepman, 1911) : synonym of Cancilla schepmani (Salisbury & Guillot de Suduiraut, 2003)
- Swainsonia olivaeformis (Swainson, 1821): synonym of Scabricola olivaeformis (Swainson, 1821)
- Swainsonia schepmani (Salisbury & Guillot de Suduiraut, 2003): synonym of Cancilla schepmani (Salisbury & Guillot de Suduiraut, 2003)
