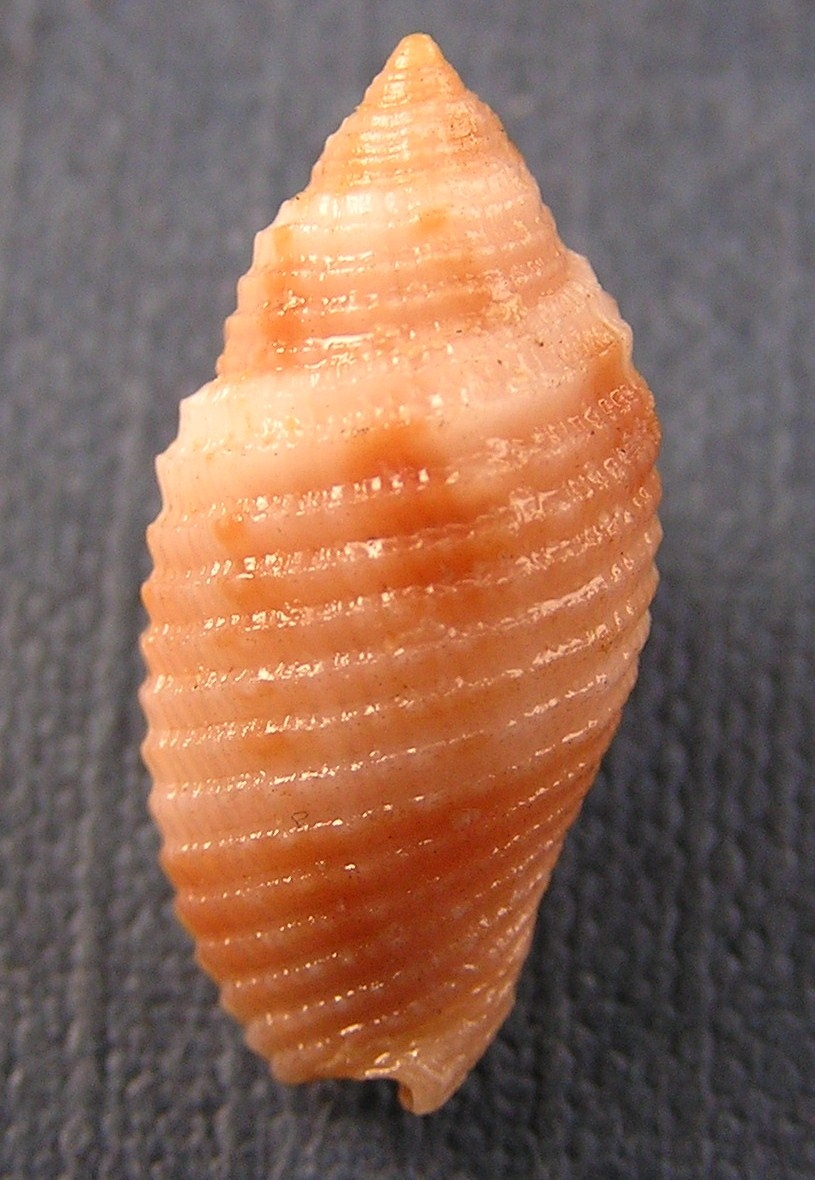
- Pterygia scabricula

Scientific classification
- Kingdom: Animalia
- Phylum: Mollusca
- Class: Gastropoda
- Subclass: Caenogastropoda
- Order: Neogastropoda
- Superfamily: Mitroidea
- Family: Mitridae
- Subfamily: Cylindromitrinae
- Genus: Pterygia; Röding, 1798

Type species
- Voluta dactylus Linnaeus, 1767

Synonyms
- Acuticylindra Iredale, 1929; Cylindra Schumacher, 1817 (invalid: junior homonym of Cylindra, Illiger 1802 [Coleoptera]; Cylindromitra is a replacement name); Cylindromitra P. Fischer, 1884; Mitra (Cylindra) Schumacher, 1817

= Pterygia (gastropod) =

Genus of gastropods

Pterygia is a genus of sea snails, marine gastropod mollusks in the subfamily Cylindromitrinae of the family Mitridae.

== Species ==
Species within the genus Pterygia include:

- Pterygia arctata (Sowerby II, 1874)
- Pterygia conus (Gmelin, 1791)
- Pterygia crenulata (Gmelin, 1791)
- Pterygia dactylus (Linnaeus, 1767)
- Pterygia deburghiae (G. B. Sowerby III, 1879) (taxon inquirendum)
- Pterygia fenestrata (Lamarck, 181)
- Pterygia glans (Reeve, 1844) (taxon inquirendum)
- Pterygia gorii (H. Turner, 2007)
- Pterygia japonica Okutani & Matsukuma, 1982
- Pterygia jeanjacquesi Bozzetti, 2010
- Pterygia morrisoni Marrow, 2016
- Pterygia nucea (Gmelin, 1791)
- Pterygia purtymuni Salisbury, 1998
- Pterygia scabricula (Linnaeus, 1767)
- Pterygia sinensis (Reeve, 1844)
- Pterygia undulosa (Reeve, 1844)

Species brought into synonymy

- Pterygia barrywilsoni J. Cate, 1968: synonym of Scabricola barrywilsoni (J. Cate, 1968) (original combination)
- Pterygia denticulata Link, 1807: synonym of Glabella denticulata (Link, 1807)
- Pterygia edentula (Swainson, 1823) synonym of Nebularia edentula (Swainson, 1823)
- Pterygia erminea Röding, 1798: synonym of Glabella faba (Linnaeus, 1758)
- Pterygia gilbertsoni J. Cate, 1968 : synonym of Scabricola gilbertsoni (J. Cate, 1968) (original combination)
- Pterygia nebulosa Röding, 1798: synonym of Marginella nebulosa (Röding, 1798)
- Pterygia nucella Röding, 1798: synonym of Pterygia dactylus (Linnaeus, 1767)
- Pterygia pudica (Pease, 1860): synonym of Strigatella pudica (Pease, 1860)
- Pterygia punctata (Swainson, 1821): synonym of Imbricariopsis punctata (Swainson, 1821)
