= Pterygia morrisoni =

Scientific classification
- Kingdom: Animalia
- Phylum: Mollusca
- Class: Gastropoda
- Subclass: Caenogastropoda
- Order: Neogastropoda
- Superfamily: Mitroidea
- Family: Mitridae
- Subfamily: Cylindromitrinae
- Genus: Pterygia
- Species: P. morrisoni

Binomial name
- Pterygia morrisoni Marrow, 2016

Species of gastropod

Pterygia morrisoni is a species of sea snail, a marine gastropod mollusk, in the family Mitridae, the miters or miter snails.

== Distribution ==
This species occurs in Dampier Archipelago.
