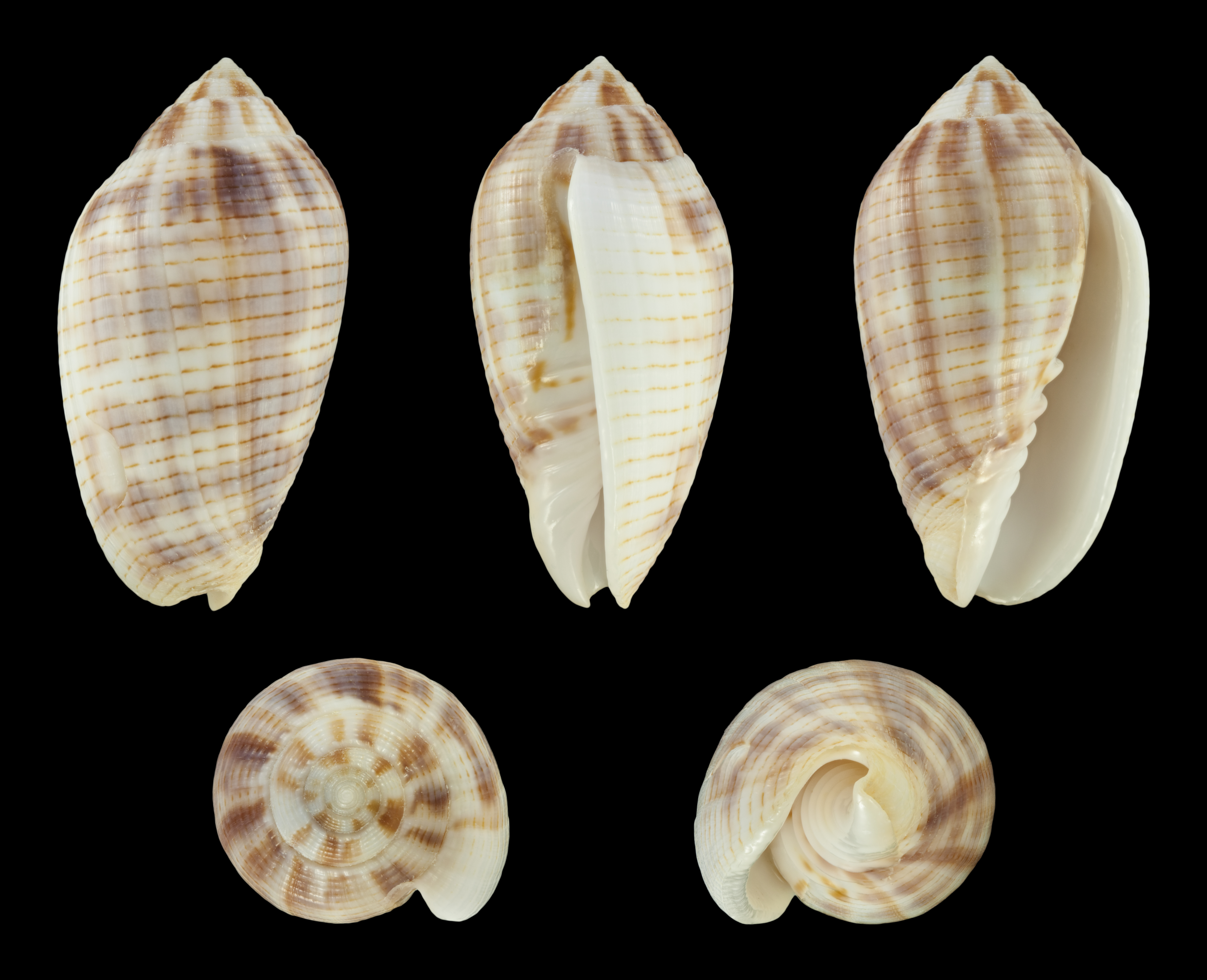

Scientific classification
- Kingdom: Animalia
- Phylum: Mollusca
- Class: Gastropoda
- Subclass: Caenogastropoda
- Order: Neogastropoda
- Family: Mitridae
- Genus: Pterygia
- Species: P. dactylus

Binomial name
- Pterygia dactylus (Linnaeus, 1767)

Synonyms
- Pterygia nucella Röding, 1798; Voluta dactylus Linnaeus, 1767 (original combination)

= Pterygia dactylus =

Species of gastropod

Pterygia dactylus is a species of sea snail, a marine gastropod mollusk in the family Mitridae, the miters or miter snails.

== Distribution ==
This marine species occurs off the Philippines and Papua New Guinea.
