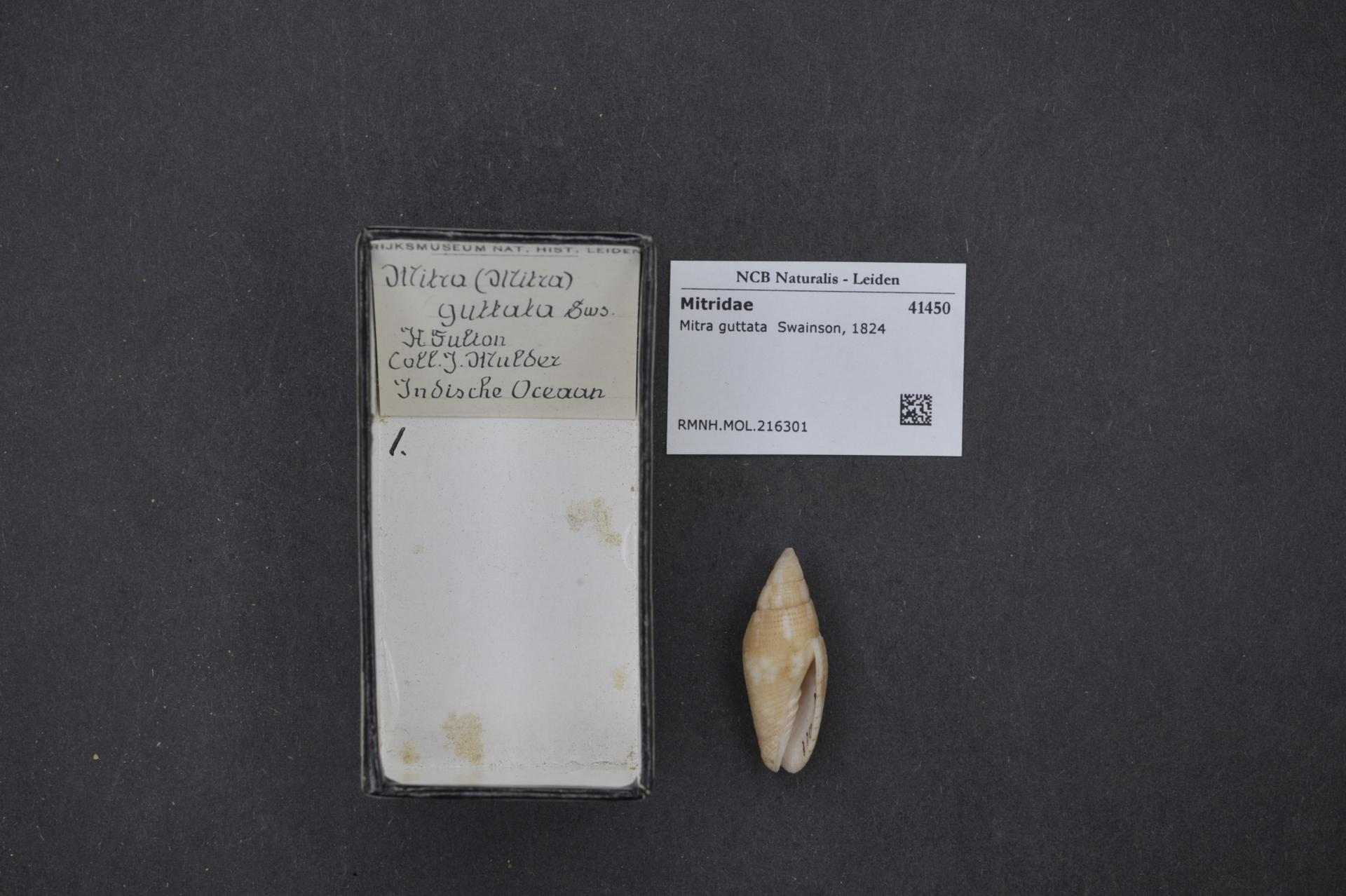
- Preserved specimen

Scientific classification
- Kingdom: Animalia
- Phylum: Mollusca
- Class: Gastropoda
- Subclass: Caenogastropoda
- Order: Neogastropoda
- Family: Mitridae
- Genus: Scabricola
- Species: S. guttata

Binomial name
- Scabricola guttata (Swainson, 1824)

Synonyms
- Mitra guttata Swainson, 1824

= Scabricola guttata =

Species of gastropod

Scabricola guttata is a species of sea snail, a marine gastropod mollusk in the family Mitridae, the miters or miter snails.
