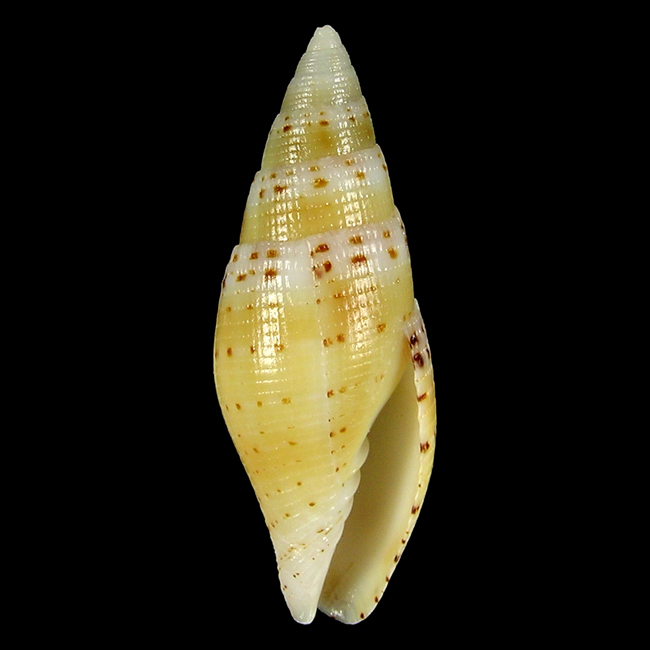

Scientific classification
- Kingdom: Animalia
- Phylum: Mollusca
- Class: Gastropoda
- Subclass: Caenogastropoda
- Order: Neogastropoda
- Family: Mitridae
- Genus: Scabricola
- Species: S. lorenzi

Binomial name
- Scabricola lorenzi (Poppe & Tagaro, 2006)

Synonyms
- Mitra lorenzi Poppe & Tagaro, 2006

= Scabricola lorenzi =

Species of gastropod

Scabricola lorenzi is a species of sea snail, a marine gastropod mollusk in the family Mitridae, the miters or miter snails.
