= Scabricola backae =

Scientific classification
- Kingdom: Animalia
- Phylum: Mollusca
- Class: Gastropoda
- Subclass: Caenogastropoda
- Order: Neogastropoda
- Superfamily: Mitroidea
- Family: Mitridae
- Subfamily: Imbricariinae
- Genus: Scabricola
- Species: S. backae

Binomial name
- Scabricola backae Cernohorsky, 1973

Synonyms
- Mitra (Mitra) backae (Cernohorsky, 1973); Mitra backae (Cernohorsky, 1973); Scabricola (Scabricola) backae Cernohorsky, 1973

Species of gastropod

Scabricola backae is a species of sea snail, a marine gastropod mollusk, in the family Mitridae, the miters or miter snails.
