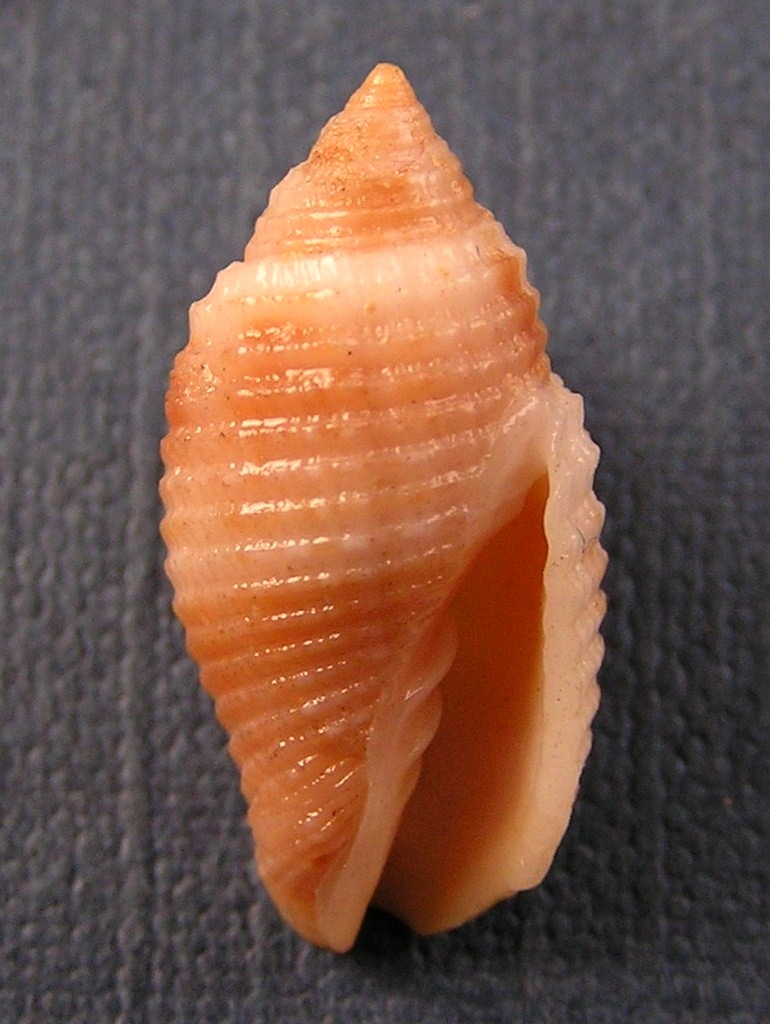

Scientific classification
- Kingdom: Animalia
- Phylum: Mollusca
- Class: Gastropoda
- Subclass: Caenogastropoda
- Order: Neogastropoda
- Family: Mitridae
- Genus: Pterygia
- Species: P. scabricula

Binomial name
- Pterygia scabricula (Linnaeus, 1767)

Synonyms
- Tiarella scabricula (Linnaeus, 1767); Voluta scabricula Linnaeus, 1767 (original combination)

= Pterygia scabricula =

Species of gastropod

Pterygia scabricula is a species of sea snail, a marine gastropod mollusk in the family Mitridae, the miters or miter snails.

== Distribution ==
Indo-Pacific. This marine species occurs off Madagascar, Japan, Western Samoa.
