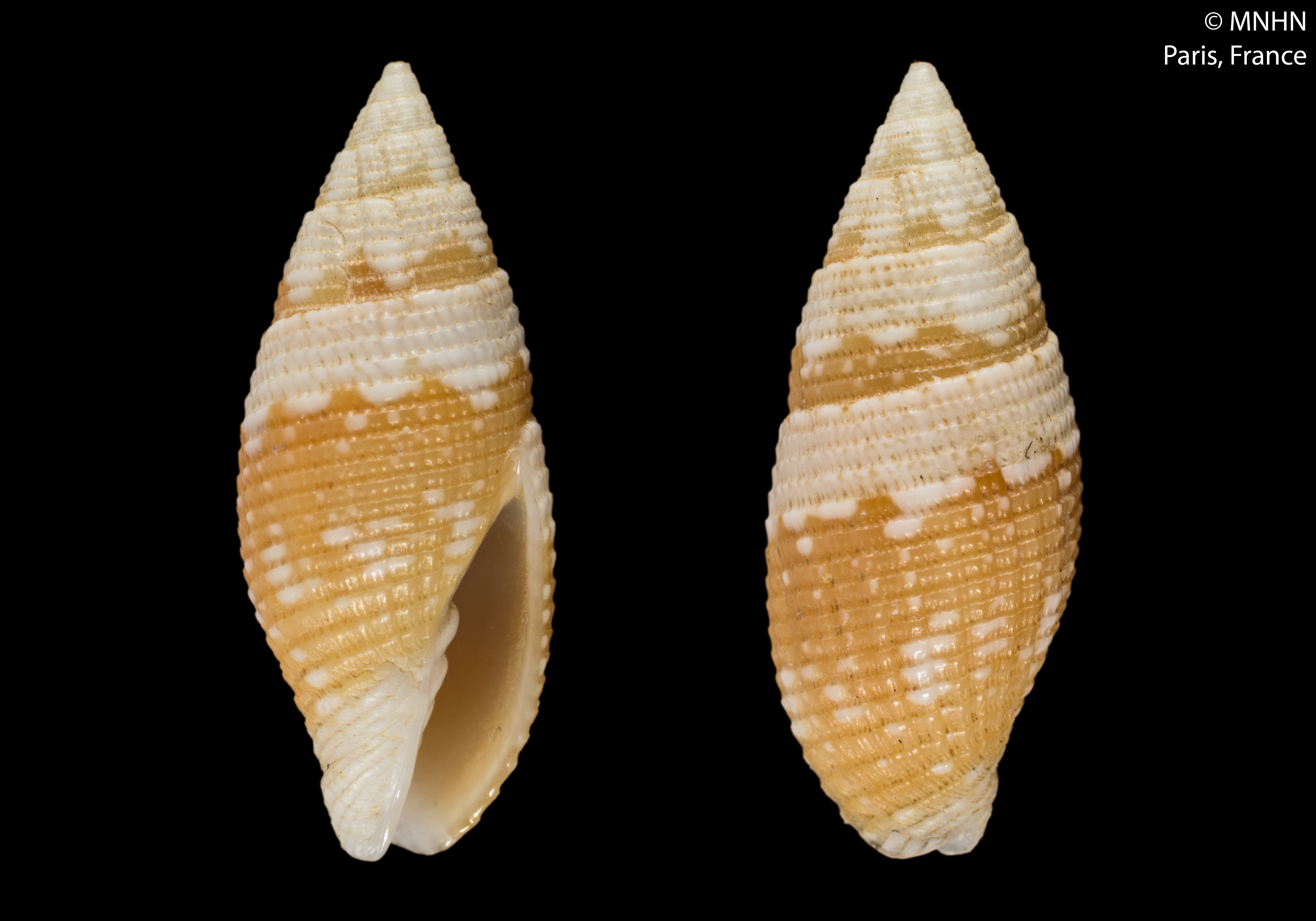
- Shell of Scabricola lavoisieri (holotype at MNHN, Paris)

Scientific classification
- Kingdom: Animalia
- Phylum: Mollusca
- Class: Gastropoda
- Subclass: Caenogastropoda
- Order: Neogastropoda
- Family: Mitridae
- Subfamily: Imbricariinae
- Genus: Scabricola
- Species: S. lavoisieri

Binomial name
- Scabricola lavoisieri Guillot de Suduiraut, 2002

Synonyms
- Neocancilla lavoisieri (Guillot de Suduiraut, 2002)

= Scabricola lavoisieri =

Species of gastropod

Scabricola lavoisieri is a species of sea snail, a marine gastropod mollusc in the family Mitridae, the miters or miter snails.

== Description ==
The length of the shell attains 16.7 mm.

== Distribution ==
This marine species occurs off the Philippines.
