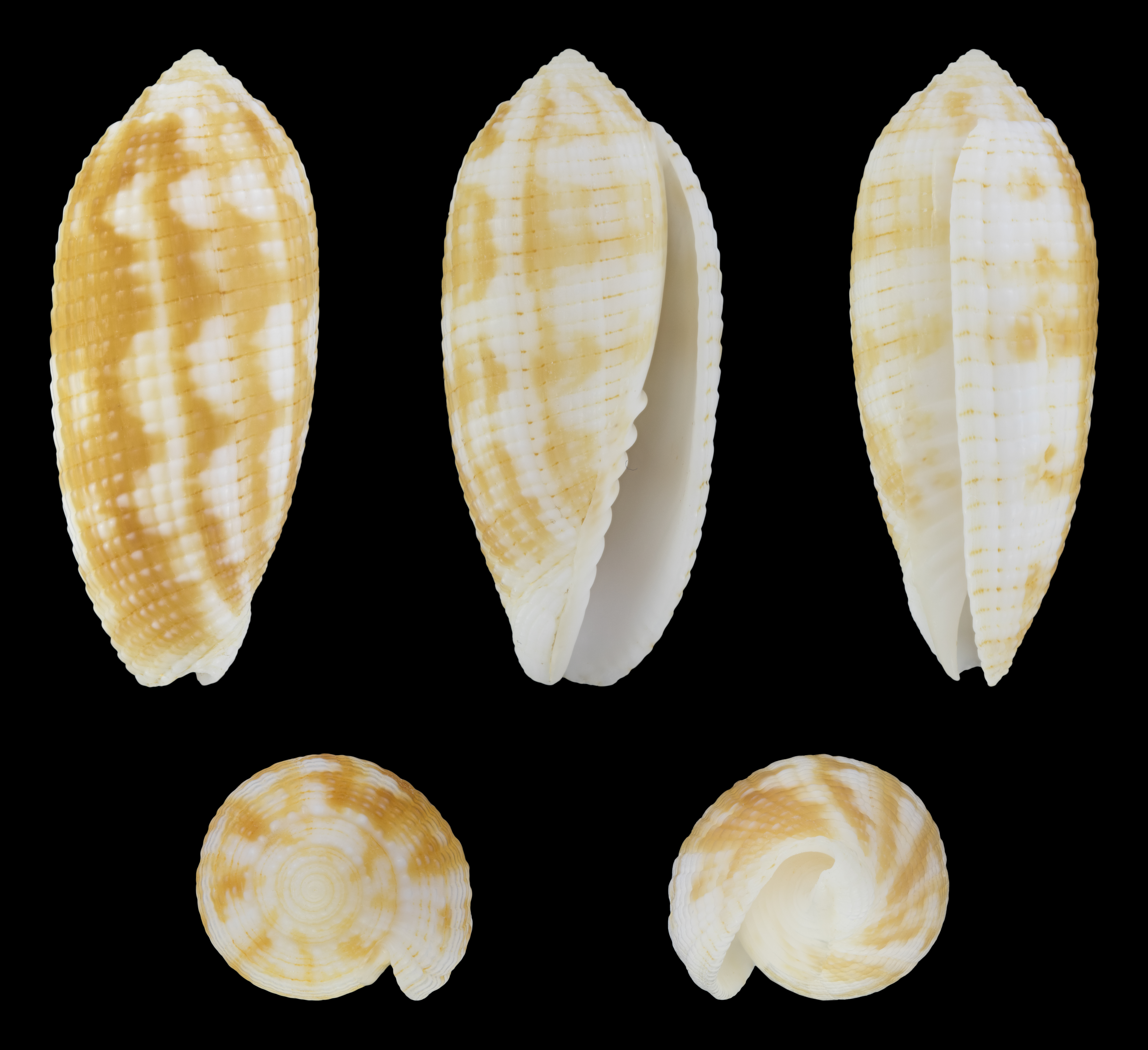

Scientific classification
- Kingdom: Animalia
- Phylum: Mollusca
- Class: Gastropoda
- Subclass: Caenogastropoda
- Order: Neogastropoda
- Family: Mitridae
- Genus: Pterygia
- Species: P. crenulata

Binomial name
- Pterygia crenulata (Gmelin, 1791)

= Pterygia crenulata =

Species of gastropod

Pterygia crenulata is a species of sea snail, a marine gastropod mollusk in the family Mitridae, the miters or miter snails.
