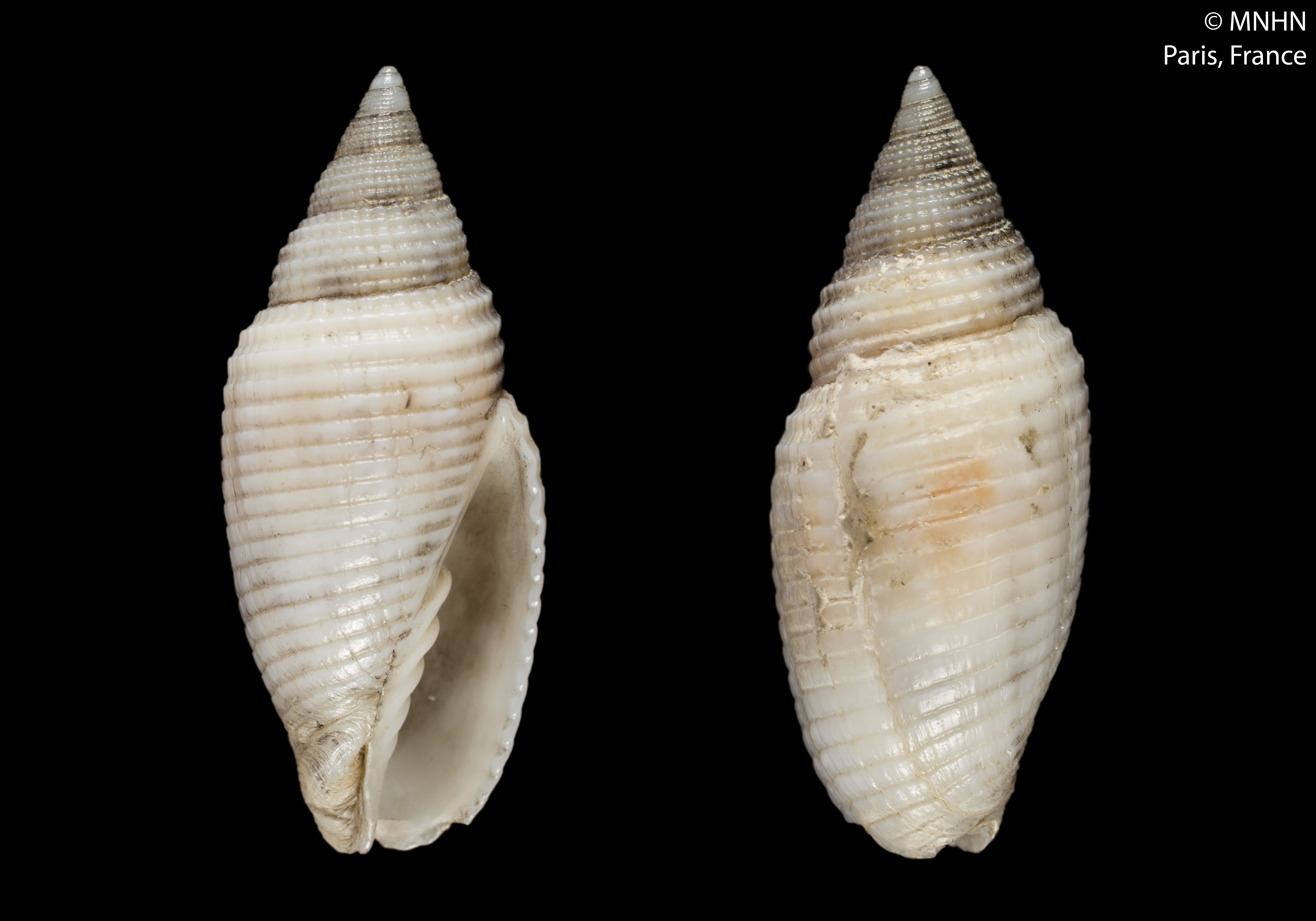
- Shell of Scabricola desetangsii (syntype at MNHN, Paris)

Scientific classification
- Kingdom: Animalia
- Phylum: Mollusca
- Class: Gastropoda
- Subclass: Caenogastropoda
- Order: Neogastropoda
- Family: Mitridae
- Genus: Scabricola
- Species: S. desetangsii

Binomial name
- Scabricola desetangsii (Kiener, 1838)

Synonyms
- Mitra desetangsii Kiener, 1838 (original combination); Mitra praevariegata Abrard, 1946; Mitra suffecta Dautzenberg & Bouge, 1923; Mitra variegata Reeve, 1844 (non Gmelin, 1791)

= Scabricola desetangsii =

Species of gastropod

Scabricola desetangsii is a species of sea snail, a marine gastropod mollusc in the family Mitridae, the miters or miter snails.

== Description ==
The length of the shell attains 28.4 mm.

== Distribution ==
This species occurs in the Indian Ocean off Mauritius Island and at Pacific Ocean at Guam.
