= Scabricola hayashii =

Scientific classification
- Kingdom: Animalia
- Phylum: Mollusca
- Class: Gastropoda
- Subclass: Caenogastropoda
- Order: Neogastropoda
- Family: Mitridae
- Genus: Scabricola
- Species: S. hayashii

Binomial name
- Scabricola hayashii (Kira, 1959)

Synonyms
- Mitra hayashii Kira, 1959

Species of gastropod

Scabricola hayashii is a species of sea snail, a marine gastropod mollusk in the family Mitridae, the miters or miter snails.
