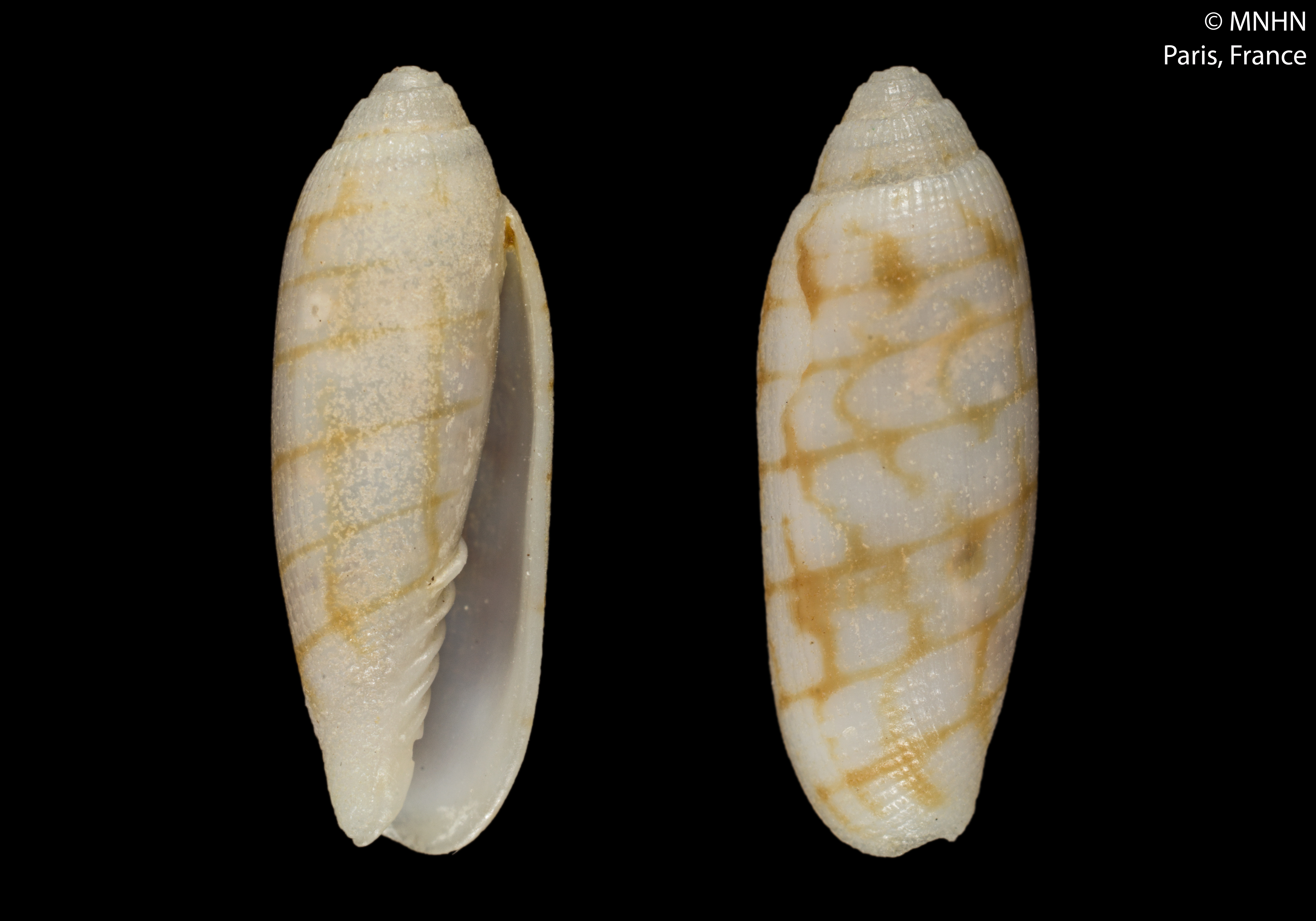
- Shell of Pterygia jeanjacquesi (holotype at MNHN, Paris)

Scientific classification
- Kingdom: Animalia
- Phylum: Mollusca
- Class: Gastropoda
- Subclass: Caenogastropoda
- Order: Neogastropoda
- Family: Mitridae
- Subfamily: Cylindromitrinae
- Genus: Pterygia
- Species: P. jeanjacquesi

Binomial name
- Pterygia jeanjacquesi Bozzetti, 2010

= Pterygia jeanjacquesi =

Species of gastropod

Pterygia jeanjacquesi is a species of sea snail, a marine gastropod mollusk, in the family Mitridae, the miters or miter snails.

== Description ==
SPECIMEN

SEC

MNHN-IM-2000-23786

Size 12

The length of the shell attains 12 mm.

TAXONOMY

Mollusca

Gastropoda

Neogastropoda

Mitridae

Pterygia

Pterygia jeanjacquesi

Name: Pterygia jeanjacquesi Bozzetti, 2010

ORIGIN

Country label

Locality

Lavanono

Ocean

Indien

Island

Madagascar

Type locality

Madagascar, Lavanono

== Distribution ==
This marine species occurs off Madagascar.
