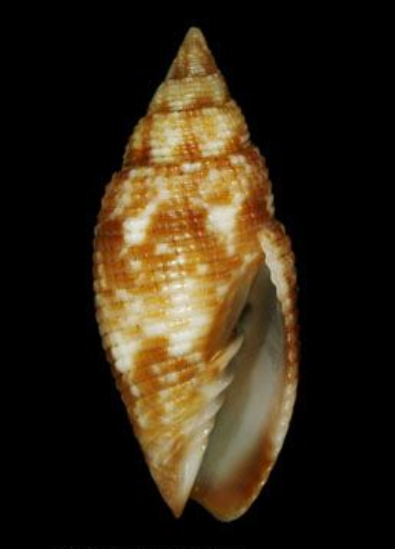
- Shell of Scabricola caerulea (specimen in the Natural History Museum, Rotterdam)

Scientific classification
- Kingdom: Animalia
- Phylum: Mollusca
- Class: Gastropoda
- Subclass: Caenogastropoda
- Order: Neogastropoda
- Family: Mitridae
- Genus: Scabricola
- Species: S. caerulea

Binomial name
- Scabricola caerulea (Reeve, 1844)

Synonyms
- Mitra caerulea Reeve, 1844 (original combination)

= Scabricola caerulea =

Species of gastropod

Scabricola caerulea, common name the blue mitre, is a species of sea snail, a marine gastropod mollusc in the family Mitridae, the miters or miter snails.

== Description ==
The length of the shell attains 27 mm.

Original description) The shell is somewhat fusiformly oblong and marked by regular, narrow, punctured transverse grooves. Its color is blueish-white, with the body whorl encircled by a broad blue band whose edges are spotted with white. The base and the aperture interior are orange-brown. The columella is five-plaited and umbilicated.

== Distribution ==
This marine species occurs off the Philippines.
