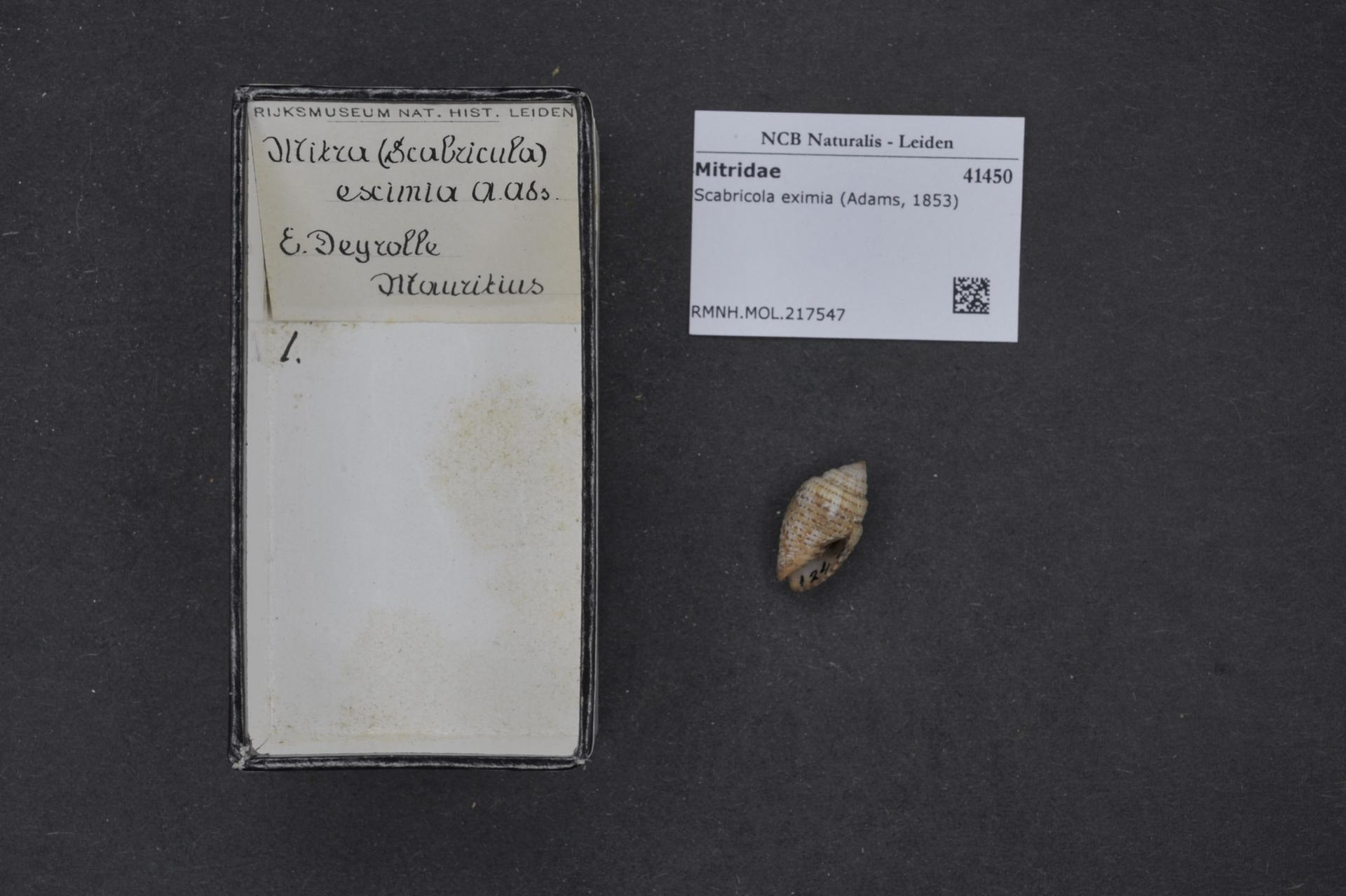
- Scabricola eximia

Scientific classification
- Kingdom: Animalia
- Phylum: Mollusca
- Class: Gastropoda
- Subclass: Caenogastropoda
- Order: Neogastropoda
- Family: Mitridae
- Genus: Scabricola
- Species: S. eximia

Binomial name
- Scabricola eximia (A. Adams, 1853)

= Scabricola eximia =

Species of gastropod

Scabricola eximia is a species of sea snail, a marine gastropod mollusc in the family Mitridae, the miters or miter snails.
