= Scabricola dampierensis =

Scientific classification
- Kingdom: Animalia
- Phylum: Mollusca
- Class: Gastropoda
- Subclass: Caenogastropoda
- Order: Neogastropoda
- Family: Mitridae
- Genus: Scabricola
- Species: S. dampierensis

Binomial name
- Scabricola dampierensis Salisbury & Heinicke, 1998

Species of gastropod

Scabricola dampierensis is a species of sea snail, a marine gastropod mollusc in the family Mitridae, the miters or miter snails.
