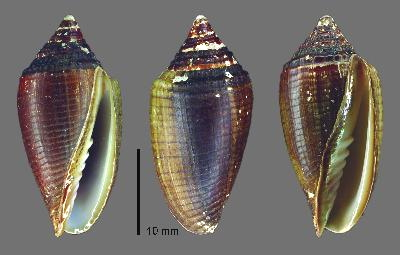
- Shells of Pterygia conus (specimen in MNHN, Paris)

Scientific classification
- Kingdom: Animalia
- Phylum: Mollusca
- Class: Gastropoda
- Subclass: Caenogastropoda
- Order: Neogastropoda
- Family: Mitridae
- Genus: Pterygia
- Species: P. conus

Binomial name
- Pterygia conus (Gmelin, 1791)

Synonyms
- Imbricaria conus (Gmelin, 1791); Voluta conus Gmelin, 1791 (original combination)

= Pterygia conus =

Species of gastropod

Pterygia conus is a species of sea snail, a marine gastropod mollusk in the family Mitridae, the miters or miter snails.

== Distribution ==
This marine species occurs off the Philippines.
