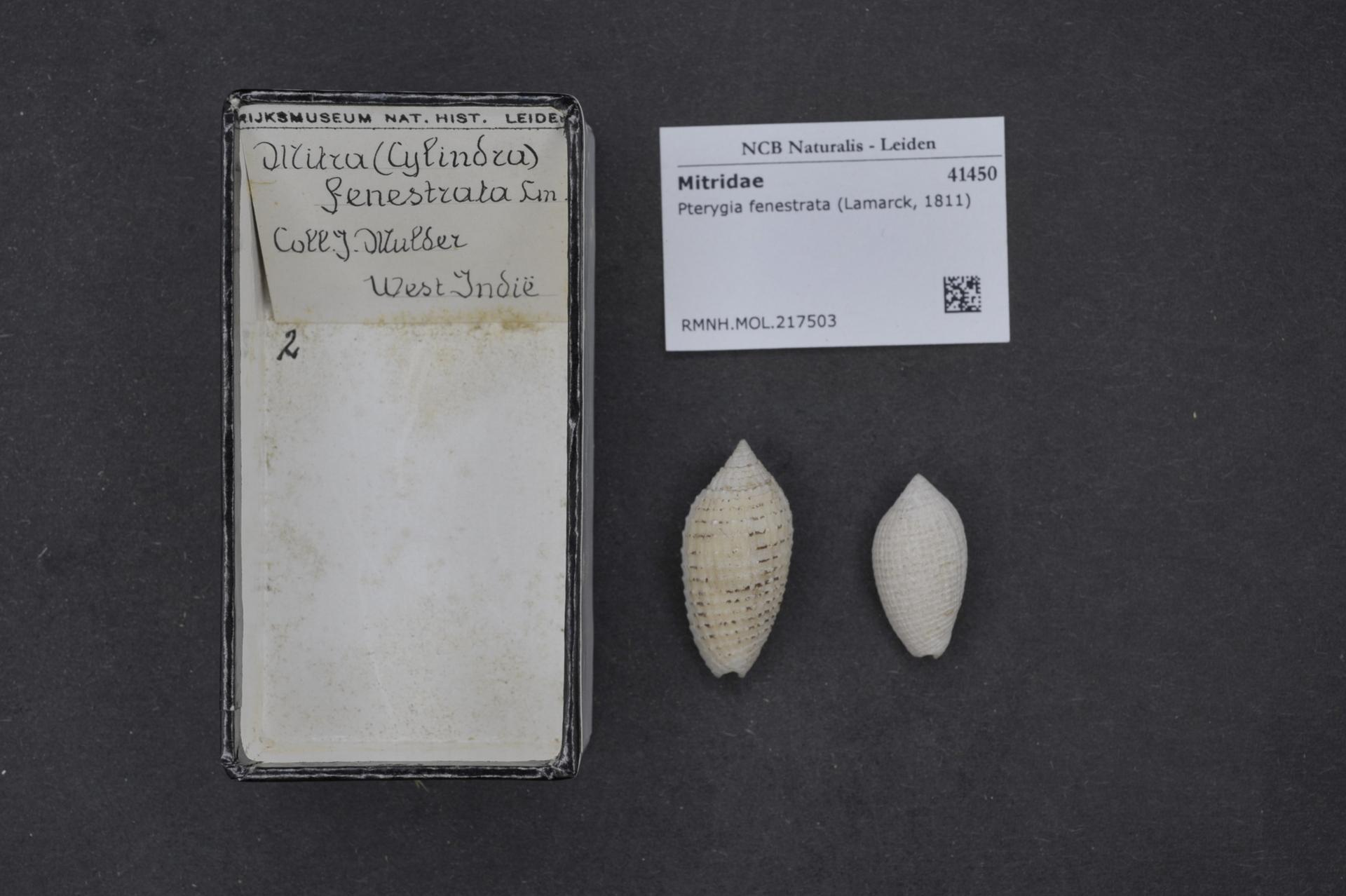

Scientific classification
- Kingdom: Animalia
- Phylum: Mollusca
- Class: Gastropoda
- Subclass: Caenogastropoda
- Order: Neogastropoda
- Family: Mitridae
- Genus: Pterygia
- Species: P. fenestrata

Binomial name
- Pterygia fenestrata (Lamarck, 1811)

= Pterygia fenestrata =

Species of gastropod

Pterygia fenestrata is a species of sea snail, a marine gastropod mollusc in the family Mitridae, the miters or miter snails.
