= Pterygia purtymuni =

Scientific classification
- Kingdom: Animalia
- Phylum: Mollusca
- Class: Gastropoda
- Subclass: Caenogastropoda
- Order: Neogastropoda
- Family: Mitridae
- Genus: Pterygia
- Species: P. purtymuni

Binomial name
- Pterygia purtymuni Salisbury, 1998

Species of gastropod

Pterygia purtymuni is a species of sea snail, a marine gastropod mollusk in the family Mitridae, the miters or miter snails.
