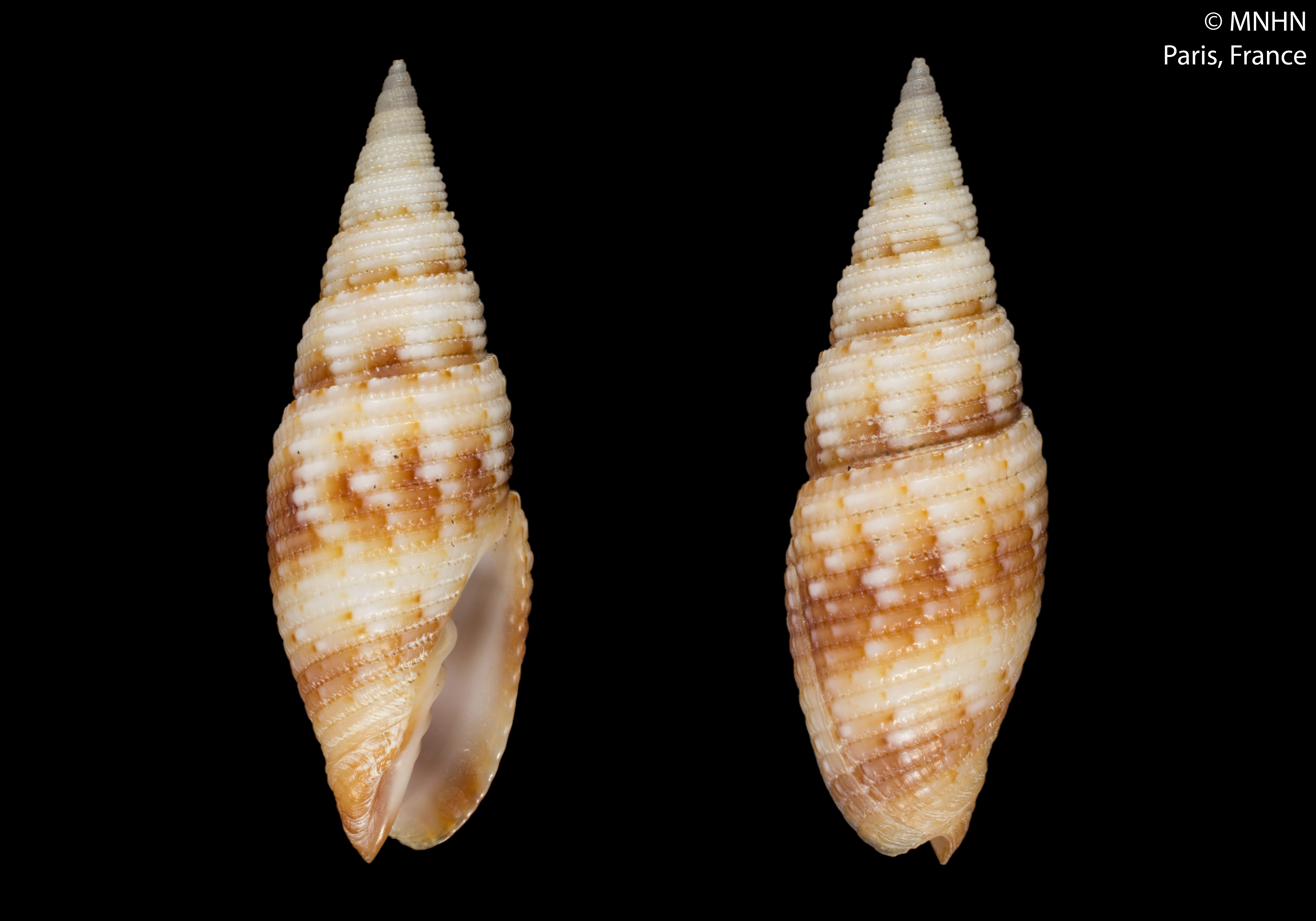
- Shell of Scabricola condei (holotype at MNHN, Paris)

Scientific classification
- Kingdom: Animalia
- Phylum: Mollusca
- Class: Gastropoda
- Subclass: Caenogastropoda
- Order: Neogastropoda
- Family: Mitridae
- Subfamily: Imbricariinae
- Genus: Scabricola
- Species: S. condei

Binomial name
- Scabricola condei Guillot de Suduiraut, 2001

Synonyms
- Neocancilla condei (Guillot de Suduiraut, 2001) ·

= Scabricola condei =

Species of gastropod

Scabricola condei is a species of sea snail, a marine gastropod mollusc in the family Mitridae, the miters or miter snails.

== Description ==
The length of the shell attains 34.2 mm.

== Distribution ==
This marine species occurs off the Philippines.
