= Scabricola yaekoae =

Scientific classification
- Kingdom: Animalia
- Phylum: Mollusca
- Class: Gastropoda
- Subclass: Caenogastropoda
- Order: Neogastropoda
- Superfamily: Mitroidea
- Family: Mitridae
- Subfamily: Imbricariinae
- Genus: Scabricola
- Species: S. yaekoae

Binomial name
- Scabricola yaekoae (Habe & Kosuge, 1966)

Synonyms
- Mitra yaekoae (Habe & Kosuge, 1966); Nebularia yaekoae Habe & Kosuge, 1966

Species of gastropod

Scabricola yaekoae is a species of sea snail, a marine gastropod mollusk, in the family Mitridae, the miters or miter snails.
