= Scabricola ivanmarrowi =

Scientific classification
- Kingdom: Animalia
- Phylum: Mollusca
- Class: Gastropoda
- Subclass: Caenogastropoda
- Order: Neogastropoda
- Superfamily: Mitroidea
- Family: Mitridae
- Subfamily: Imbricariinae
- Genus: Scabricola
- Species: S. ivanmarrowi

Binomial name
- Scabricola ivanmarrowi Marrow, 2016

Synonyms
- Scabricola (Scabricola) ivanmarrowi Marrow, 2016

Species of gastropod

Scabricola ivanmarrowi is a species of sea snail, a marine gastropod mollusk, in the family Mitridae, the miters or miter snails.
