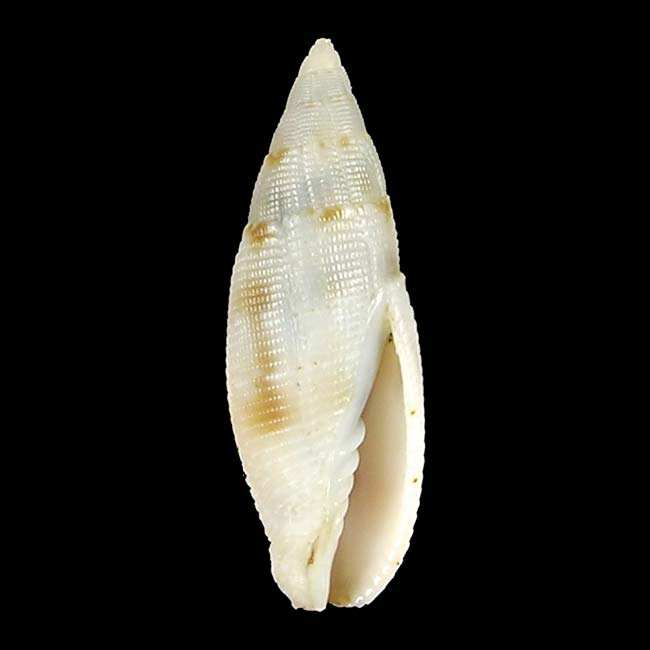

Scientific classification
- Kingdom: Animalia
- Phylum: Mollusca
- Class: Gastropoda
- Subclass: Caenogastropoda
- Order: Neogastropoda
- Family: Mitridae
- Genus: Scabricola
- Species: S. martini

Binomial name
- Scabricola martini Poppe & Tagaro, 2006

= Scabricola martini =

Species of gastropod

Scabricola martini is a species of sea snail, a marine gastropod mollusc in the family Mitridae, the miters or miter snails.
