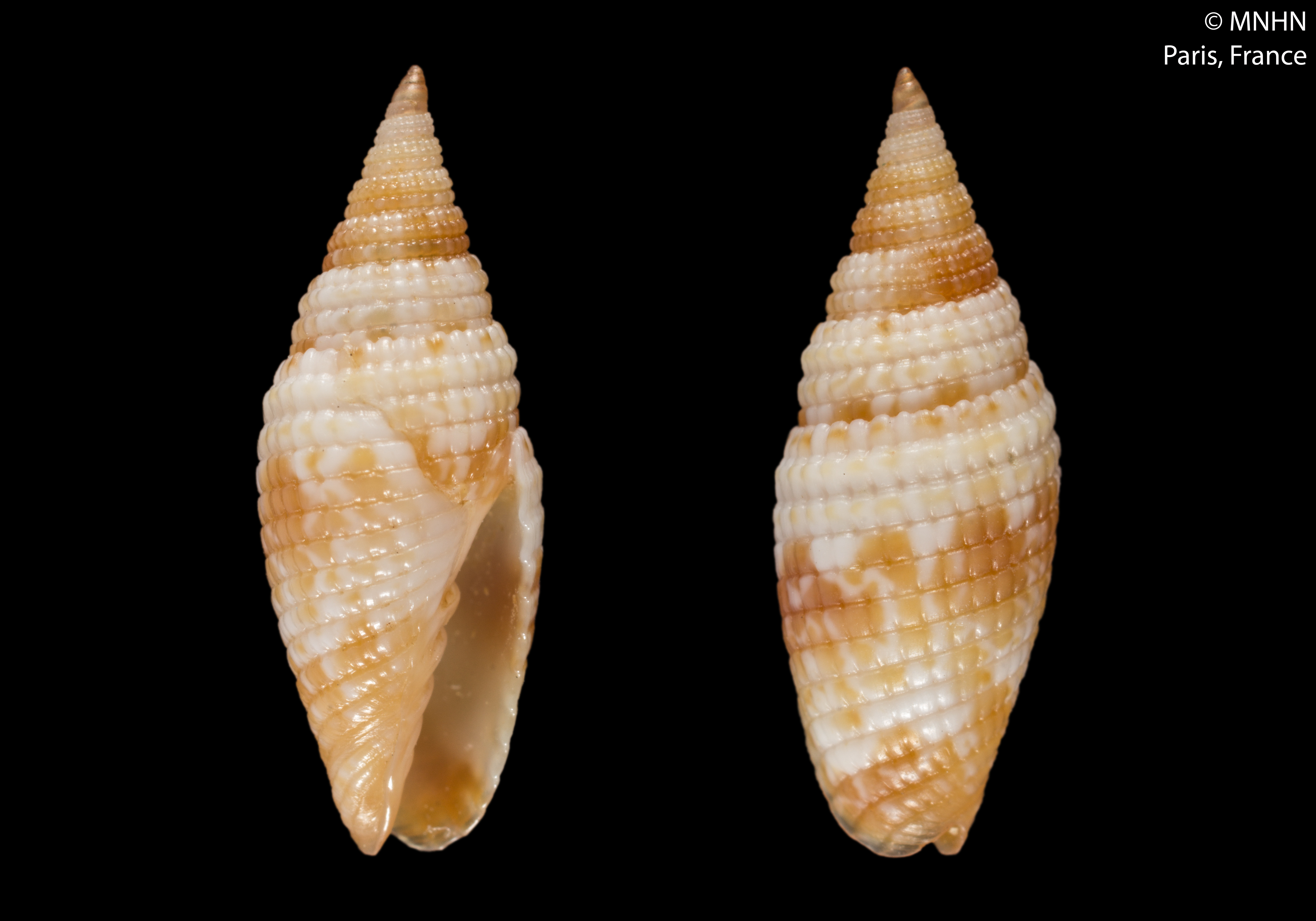
- Shell of Scabricola splendidula (holotype at MNHN, Paris)

Scientific classification
- Kingdom: Animalia
- Phylum: Mollusca
- Class: Gastropoda
- Subclass: Caenogastropoda
- Order: Neogastropoda
- Family: Mitridae
- Subfamily: Imbricariinae
- Genus: Scabricola
- Species: S. splendidula

Binomial name
- Scabricola splendidula Salisbury & Guillot de Suduiraut, 2003

Synonyms
- Neocancilla splendidula (R. Salisbury & Guillot de Suduiraut, 2003)

= Scabricola splendidula =

Species of gastropod

Scabricola splendidula is a species of sea snail, a marine gastropod mollusc in the family Mitridae, the miters or miter snails.

== Description ==
Small shells, about 15 mm. Teleoconch with 6 or 7 whorls. Reddish-brown.

== Distribution ==
Philippine Islands and the Solomon Islands, 20-183 m.
