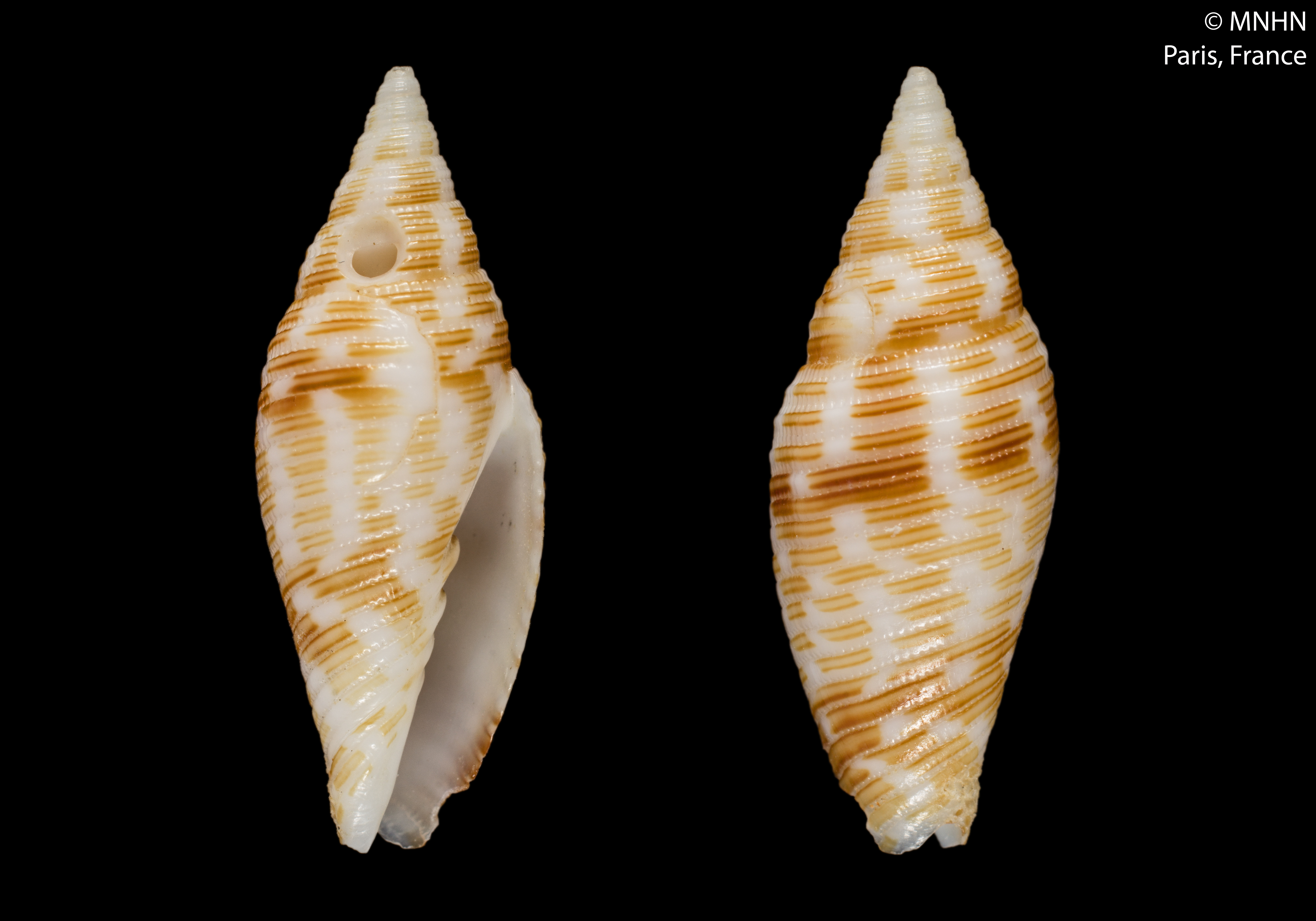
- Shell of Scabricola dianneae (holotype at MNHN, Paris)

Scientific classification
- Kingdom: Animalia
- Phylum: Mollusca
- Class: Gastropoda
- Subclass: Caenogastropoda
- Order: Neogastropoda
- Family: Mitridae
- Genus: Scabricola
- Species: S. dianneae

Binomial name
- Scabricola dianneae (Salisbury & Guillot de Suduiraut, 2003)

Synonyms
- Domiporta dianneae Salisbury & Guillot de Suduiraut, 2003; Ziba dianneae (R. Salisbury & Guillot de Suduiraut, 2003)

= Scabricola dianneae =

Species of gastropod

Scabricola dianneae is a species of sea snail, a marine gastropod mollusk in the family Mitridae, the miters or miter snails.

== Distribution ==
This marine species occurs off the Philippines.
