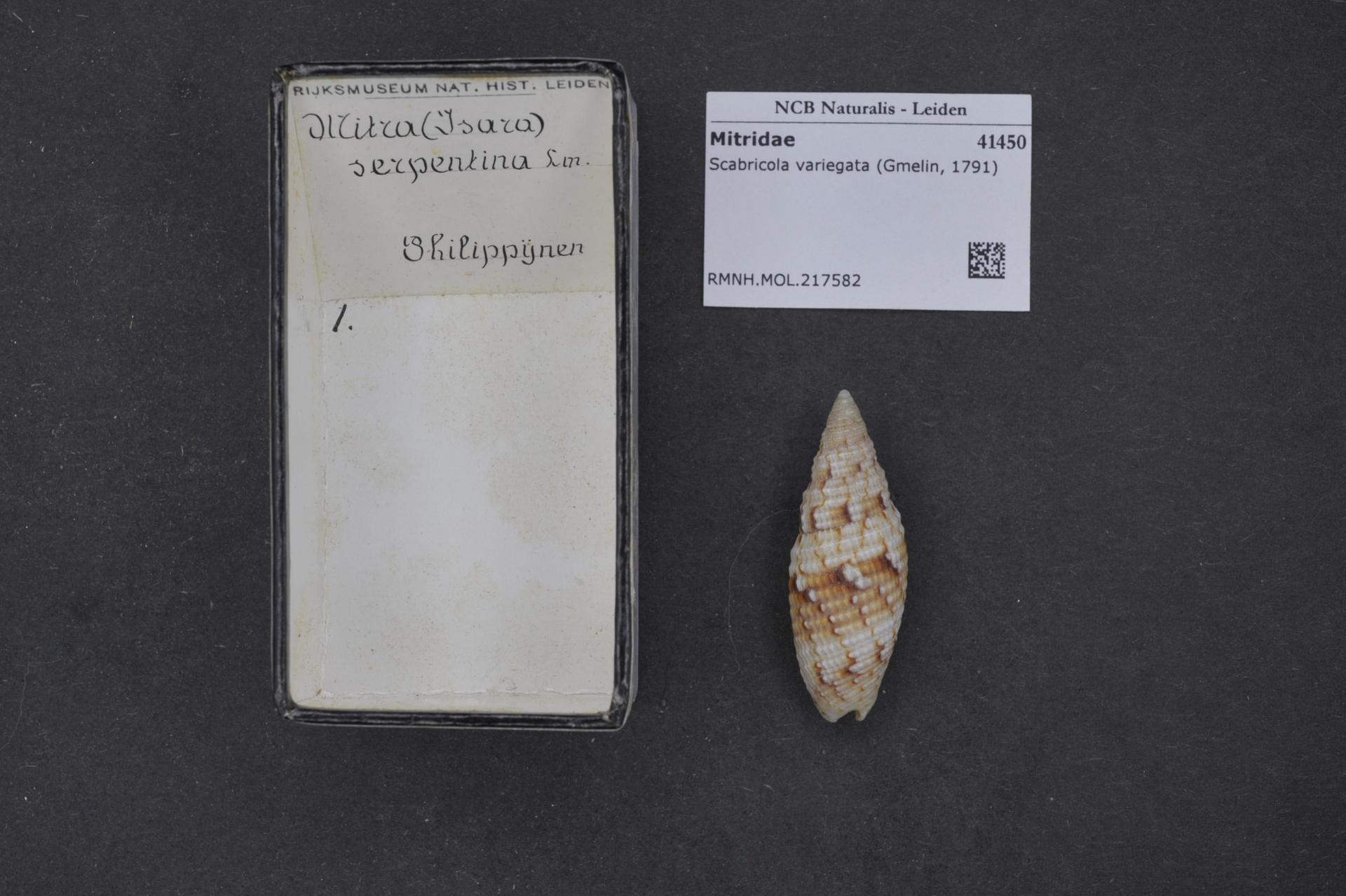

Scientific classification
- Kingdom: Animalia
- Phylum: Mollusca
- Class: Gastropoda
- Subclass: Caenogastropoda
- Order: Neogastropoda
- Family: Mitridae
- Genus: Scabricola
- Species: S. variegata

Binomial name
- Scabricola variegata (Gmelin, 1791)

= Scabricola variegata =

Species of gastropod

Scabricola variegata is a species of sea snail, a marine gastropod mollusc in the family Mitridae, the miters or miter snails.
