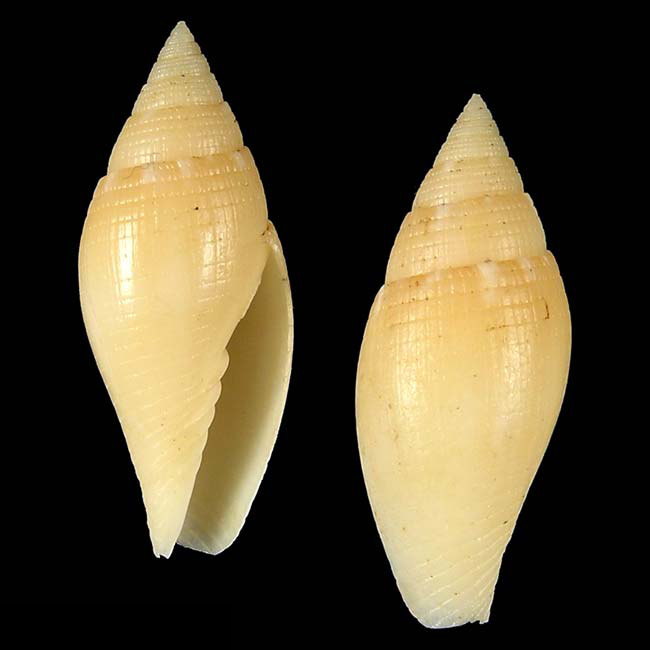

Scientific classification
- Kingdom: Animalia
- Phylum: Mollusca
- Class: Gastropoda
- Subclass: Caenogastropoda
- Order: Neogastropoda
- Family: Mitridae
- Subfamily: Imbricariinae
- Genus: Scabricola
- Species: S. geigeri

Binomial name
- Scabricola geigeri Poppe, Tagaro & Salisbury, 2009

Synonyms
- Mitra (Mitra) geigeri (Poppe, Tagaro & R. Salisbury, 2009); Mitra geigeri (Poppe, Tagaro & R. Salisbury, 2009)

= Scabricola geigeri =

Species of gastropod

Scabricola geigeri is a species of sea snail, a marine gastropod mollusc in the family Mitridae, the miters or miter snails.

== Distribution ==
This marine species occurs off the Philippines.
