= Swainsonia limata =

Scientific classification
- Kingdom: Animalia
- Phylum: Mollusca
- Class: Gastropoda
- Subclass: Caenogastropoda
- Order: Neogastropoda
- Family: Mitridae
- Genus: Swainsonia
- Species: S. limata

Binomial name
- Swainsonia limata (Reeve, 1845)

Synonyms
- Mitra limata Reeve, 1845; Mitra zephyrina G. B. Sowerby II, 1874

Species of gastropod

Swainsonia limata is a species of sea snail, a marine gastropod mollusk in the family Mitridae, the miters or miter snails.
