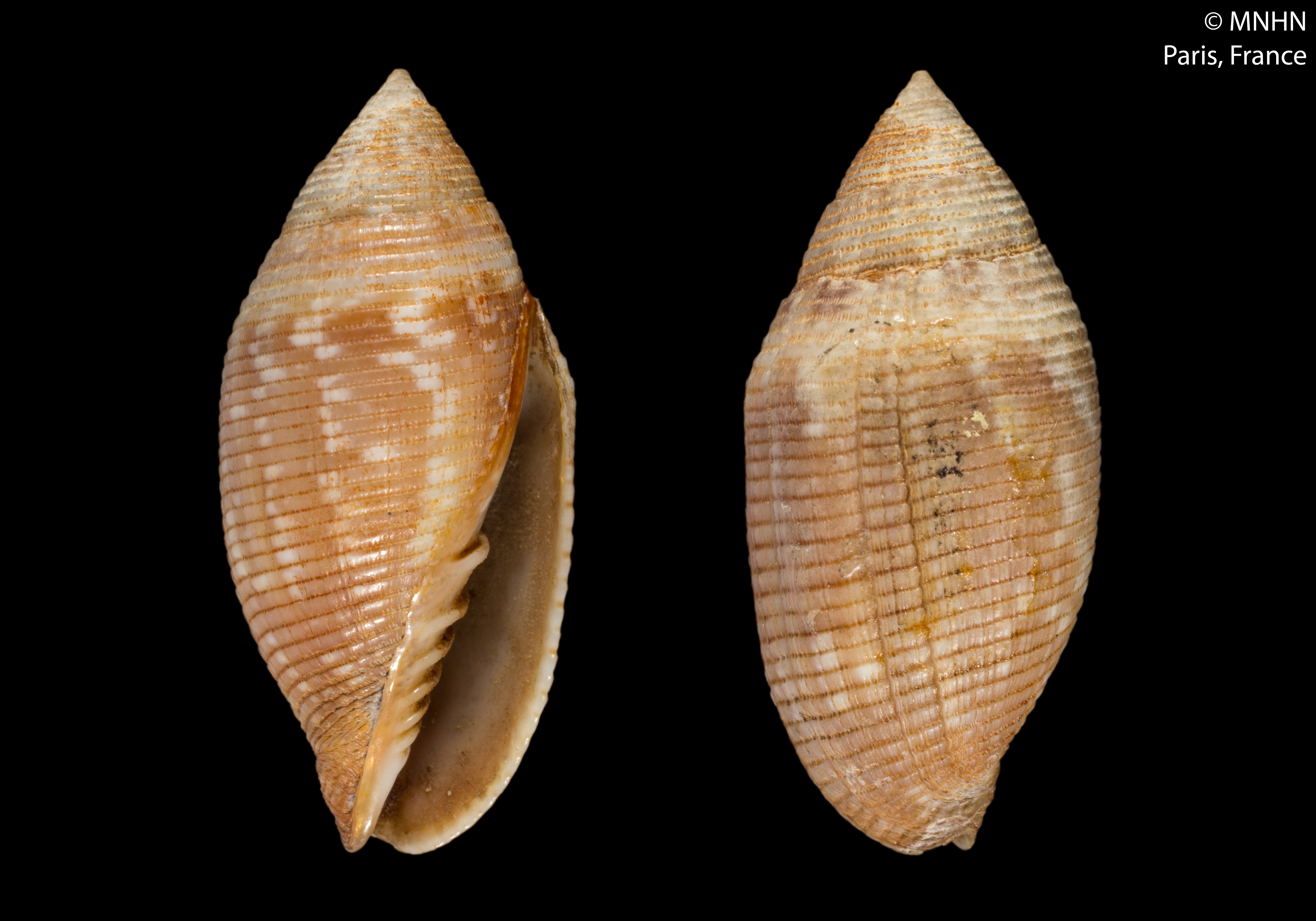
- Shell of Scabricola potensis (lectotype at MNHN, Paris)

Scientific classification
- Kingdom: Animalia
- Phylum: Mollusca
- Class: Gastropoda
- Subclass: Caenogastropoda
- Order: Neogastropoda
- Family: Mitridae
- Genus: Scabricola
- Species: S. potensis

Binomial name
- Scabricola potensis (Montrouzier, 1858)

Synonyms
- Mitra potensis Montrouzier, 1858 (original combination)

= Scabricola potensis =

Species of gastropod

Scabricola potensis is a species of sea snail, a marine gastropod mollusc in the family Mitridae, the miters or miter snails.

== Description ==
The length of the shell attains 24.5 mm. The species is known for its rough, elevated ridges and longitudinal striae on the shell. The suture isn't coronated, the aperture is effuse, and the outer lip is crenate.

== Distribution ==
This marine species occurs off the coast of New Caledonia, and in the Red Sea and Persian Gulf.
