= Pterygia sinensis =

Scientific classification
- Kingdom: Animalia
- Phylum: Mollusca
- Class: Gastropoda
- Subclass: Caenogastropoda
- Order: Neogastropoda
- Family: Mitridae
- Genus: Pterygia
- Species: P. sinensis

Binomial name
- Pterygia sinensis (Reeve, 1844)

Synonyms
- Cylindromitra sinensis (Reeve, 1844)

Species of gastropod

Pterygia sinensis is a species of small sea snail, a gastropod mollusk in the family Mitridae, the miters or miter snails.

== Description ==
Shell length around 40 mm.

== Distribution ==
This species is seen around Japan (south of Kii Peninsula), Taiwan (Tainan, Hsiao Liouciou Island and Penghu) and Mainland China in West Pacific Ocean.。

Habitat in sand of depth 30–300 m.
