= Scabricola sowerbyi =

Scientific classification
- Kingdom: Animalia
- Phylum: Mollusca
- Class: Gastropoda
- Subclass: Caenogastropoda
- Order: Neogastropoda
- Family: Mitridae
- Genus: Scabricola
- Species: S. sowerbyi

Binomial name
- Scabricola sowerbyi (d'Orbigny, 1852)

Synonyms
- Mitra sowerbyi d'Orbigny, 1852

Species of gastropod

Scabricola sowerbyi is a species of sea snail, a marine gastropod mollusk in the family Mitridae, the miters or miter snails.
