= Swainsonia ekerae =

Scientific classification
- Kingdom: Animalia
- Phylum: Mollusca
- Class: Gastropoda
- Subclass: Caenogastropoda
- Order: Neogastropoda
- Superfamily: Mitroidea
- Family: Mitridae
- Subfamily: Imbricariinae
- Genus: Swainsonia
- Species: S. ekerae

Binomial name
- Swainsonia ekerae (Cernohorsky, 1973)

Synonyms
- Scabricola (Swainsonia) ocellata ekerae Cernohorsky, 1973; Scabricola ocellata ekerae Cernohorsky, 1973

Species of gastropod

Swainsonia ekerae is a species of sea snail, a marine gastropod mollusk, in the family Mitridae, the miters or miter snails.
