= Pterygia arctata =

Scientific classification
- Kingdom: Animalia
- Phylum: Mollusca
- Class: Gastropoda
- Subclass: Caenogastropoda
- Order: Neogastropoda
- Family: Mitridae
- Genus: Pterygia
- Species: P. arctata

Binomial name
- Pterygia arctata (Sowerby, 1874)

Synonyms
- Mitra arctata G. B. Sowerby II, 1874 ·

Species of gastropod

Pterygia arctata is a species of sea snail, a marine gastropod mollusk in the family Mitridae, the miters or miter snails.

== Description ==
The shell is narrow and cylindrical. It is finely spirally striated, painted with yellow flames in two rows. The spire is short and obtuse. The aperture is elongated, straight and narrow. This species attains a size of 20 mm.

== Distribution ==
This marine species is endemic to Australia and occurs off Western Australia.
