= Pterygia gorii =

Scientific classification
- Kingdom: Animalia
- Phylum: Mollusca
- Class: Gastropoda
- Subclass: Caenogastropoda
- Order: Neogastropoda
- Family: Mitridae
- Genus: Pterygia
- Species: P. gorii

Binomial name
- Pterygia gorii Turner, 2007

Synonyms
- Scabricola gorii Turner, 2007

Species of gastropod

Pterygia gorii is a species of sea snail, a marine gastropod mollusk in the family Mitridae, the miters or miter snails.
