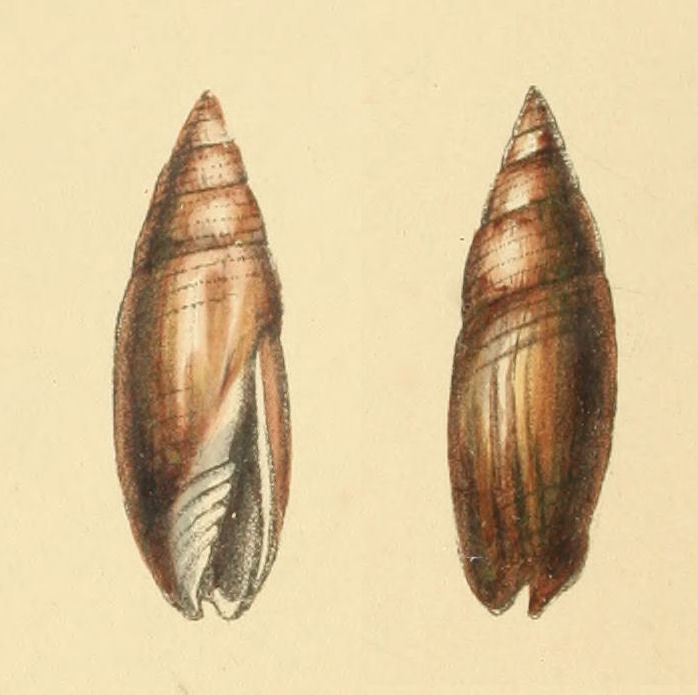

Scientific classification
- Kingdom: Animalia
- Phylum: Mollusca
- Class: Gastropoda
- Subclass: Caenogastropoda
- Order: Neogastropoda
- Family: Mitridae
- Genus: Swainsonia
- Species: S. fusca

Binomial name
- Swainsonia fusca (Swainson, 1824)

Synonyms
- Mitra fusca Swainson, 1823; Mitra zephyrina Sowerby, 1874

= Swainsonia fusca =

Species of gastropod

Swainsonia fusca, common name : the dusky mitre, is a species of sea snail, a marine gastropod mollusk in the family Mitridae, the miters or miter snails.

== Description ==
The shell is nearly spindle-shaped, entirely brown and marked by bands of punctured dots. Size varies between 14 mm and 30 mm.

== Distribution ==
This species is distributed in the Red Sea, in the Indian Ocean off Mozambique, Mauritius and the Mascarene Basin and in the Atlantic Ocean along Angola.
