= Scabricola gilbertsoni =

Scientific classification
- Kingdom: Animalia
- Phylum: Mollusca
- Class: Gastropoda
- Subclass: Caenogastropoda
- Order: Neogastropoda
- Family: Mitridae
- Genus: Scabricola
- Species: S. gilbertsoni

Binomial name
- Scabricola gilbertsoni (Cate, 1968)

Synonyms
- Mitra gilbertsoni (Cate, 1968)

Species of gastropod

Scabricola gilbertsoni is a species of sea snail, a marine gastropod mollusk in the family Mitridae, the miters or miter snails.

== Description ==
Shell size 50 mm.

== Distribution ==
Western Australia.
