= Scabricola mariae =

Scientific classification
- Kingdom: Animalia
- Phylum: Mollusca
- Class: Gastropoda
- Subclass: Caenogastropoda
- Order: Neogastropoda
- Superfamily: Mitroidea
- Family: Mitridae
- Subfamily: Imbricariinae
- Genus: Scabricola
- Species: S. mariae

Binomial name
- Scabricola mariae (A. Adams, 1853)

Synonyms
- Mitra mariae A. Adams, 1853; Swainsonia mariae (A. Adams, 1853); Swainsonia ocellata f. mariae (A. Adams, 1853)

Species of gastropod

Scabricola mariae is a species of sea snail, a marine gastropod mollusk, in the family Mitridae, the miters or miter snails.
