= Scabricola incisa =

Scientific classification
- Kingdom: Animalia
- Phylum: Mollusca
- Class: Gastropoda
- Subclass: Caenogastropoda
- Order: Neogastropoda
- Superfamily: Mitroidea
- Family: Mitridae
- Subfamily: Imbricariinae
- Genus: Scabricola
- Species: S. incisa

Binomial name
- Scabricola incisa (A. Adams & Reeve, 1850)

Synonyms
- Mitra incisa A. Adams & Reeve, 1850; Scabricola (Swainsonia) incisa (A. Adams & Reeve, 1850); Swainsonia incisa (A. Adams & Reeve, 1850)

Species of gastropod

Scabricola incisa is a species of sea snail, a marine gastropod mollusk, in the family Mitridae, the miters or miter snails.
