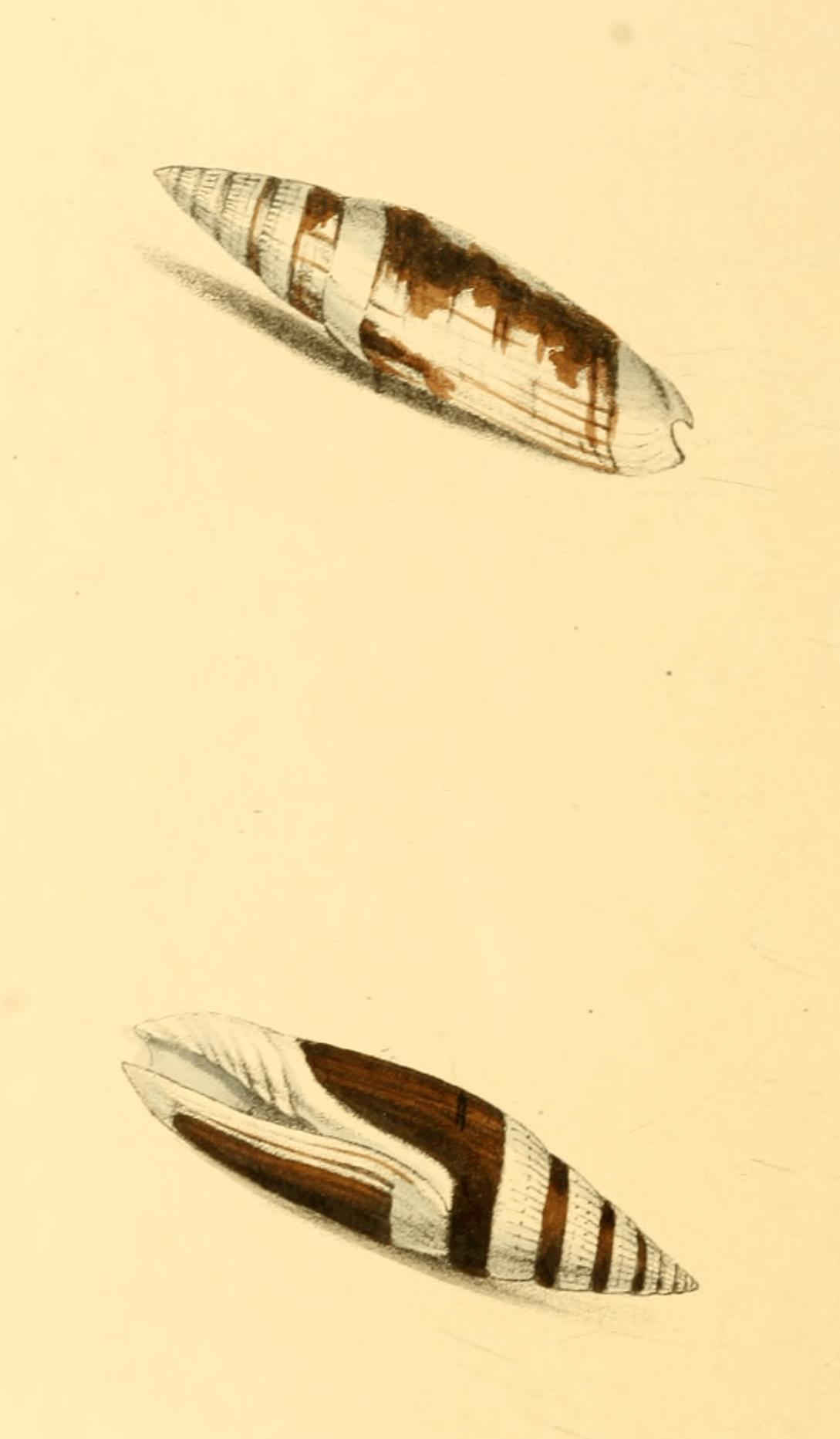
- Plate 48. Mitra casta. Chesnut-banded Mitre. Modern accepted name (2012) is Scabricola casta

Scientific classification
- Kingdom: Animalia
- Phylum: Mollusca
- Class: Gastropoda
- Subclass: Caenogastropoda
- Order: Neogastropoda
- Family: Mitridae
- Genus: Swainsonia
- Species: S. casta

Binomial name
- Swainsonia casta (Gmelin, 1791)

Synonyms
- Mitra matronalis Schumacher, H.C.F., 1817; Mitra laevis Adams, A., 1853; Scabricola (Swainsonia) casta (Gmelin, 1791); Scabricola casta (Gmelin, 1791); Voluta casta Gmelin, 1791 (original combination)

= Swainsonia casta =

Species of gastropod

Swainsonia casta, common name the chaste mitre, is a species of sea snail, a marine gastropod mollusk in the family Mitridae, the miters or miter snails.

== Description ==
The length of the shell varies between 20 mm and 55 mm.

== Distribution ==
This marine species occurs off East Africa to Japan; off Pitcairn and Polynesia.
