= Scabricola barrywilsoni =

Scientific classification
- Kingdom: Animalia
- Phylum: Mollusca
- Class: Gastropoda
- Subclass: Caenogastropoda
- Order: Neogastropoda
- Family: Mitridae
- Genus: Scabricola
- Species: S. barrywilsoni

Binomial name
- Scabricola barrywilsoni (J. Cate, 1968)

Species of gastropod

Scabricola barrywilsoni is a species of sea snail, a marine gastropod mollusc in the family Mitridae, the miters or miter snails.
