= Scabricola albina =

Scientific classification
- Kingdom: Animalia
- Phylum: Mollusca
- Class: Gastropoda
- Subclass: Caenogastropoda
- Order: Neogastropoda
- Family: Mitridae
- Genus: Scabricola
- Species: S. albina

Binomial name
- Scabricola albina (A. Adams, 1853)

Synonyms
- Mitra (Mitra) albina A. Adams, 1853; Mitra albina A. Adams, 1853 (original combination); Swainsonia albina (A. Adams, 1853)

Species of gastropod

Scabricola albina is a species of sea snail, a marine gastropod mollusk in the family Mitridae, the miters or miter snails.

== Description ==
The length of the shell varies between 25 mm and 35 mm.

== Distribution ==
This species occurs in the Pacific Ocean and off the Philippines.
