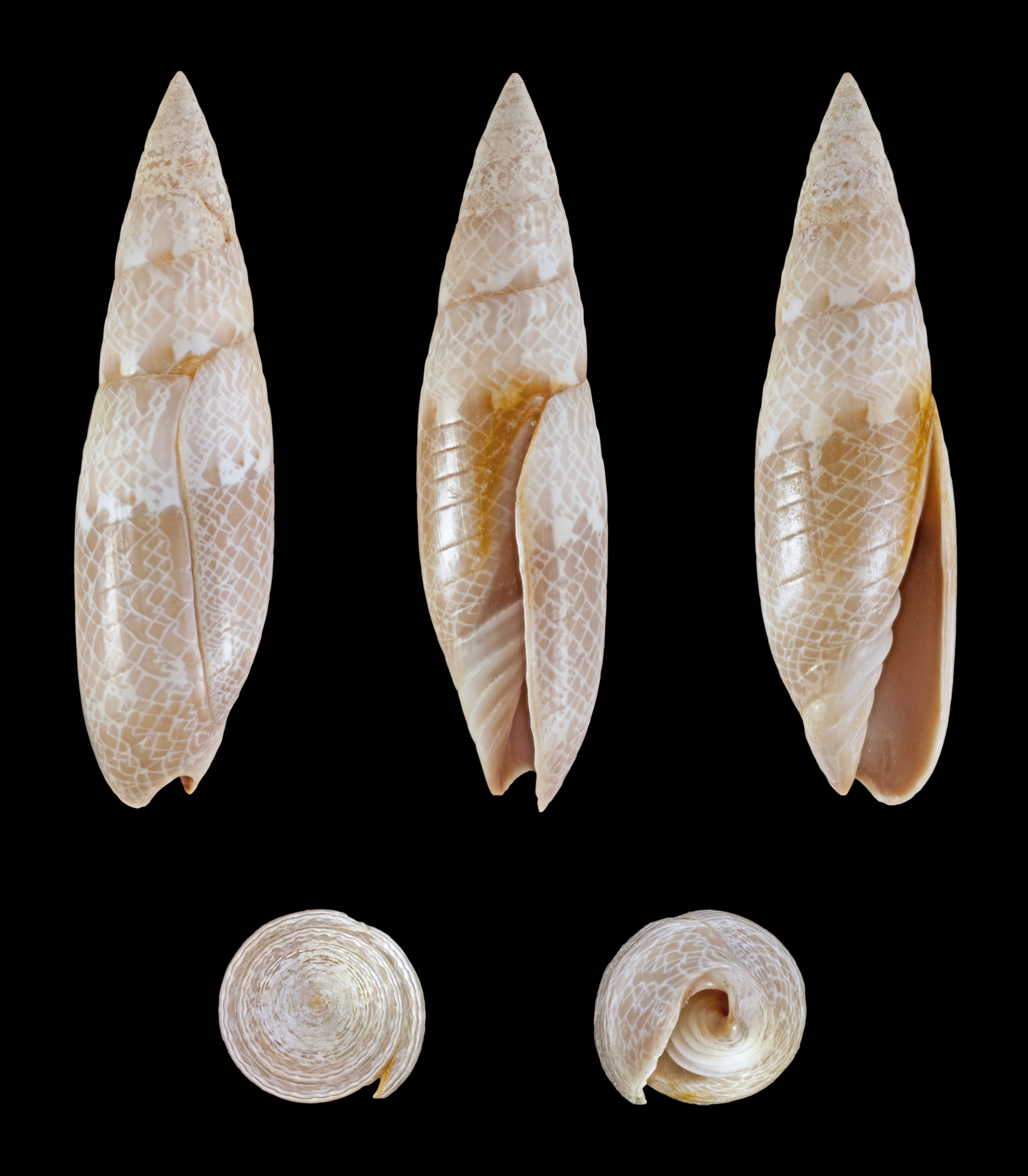

Scientific classification
- Kingdom: Animalia
- Phylum: Mollusca
- Class: Gastropoda
- Subclass: Caenogastropoda
- Order: Neogastropoda
- Family: Mitridae
- Genus: Swainsonia
- Species: S. fissurata

Binomial name
- Swainsonia fissurata (Lamarck, 1811)

Synonyms
- Mitra fissurata Lamarck, 1811; Scabricola (Swainsonia) fissurata (Lamarck, 1811); Scabricola fissurata (Lamarck, 1811)

= Swainsonia fissurata =

Species of gastropod

Swainsonia fissurata, common name : the reticulate mitre, is a species of sea snail, a marine gastropod mollusk in the family Mitridae, the miters or miter snails.

== Description ==
The shell size varies between 21 mm and 65 mm.

== Distribution ==
This species occurs in the Red Sea and in the Indian Ocean off East Africa and the Mascarene Basin.
