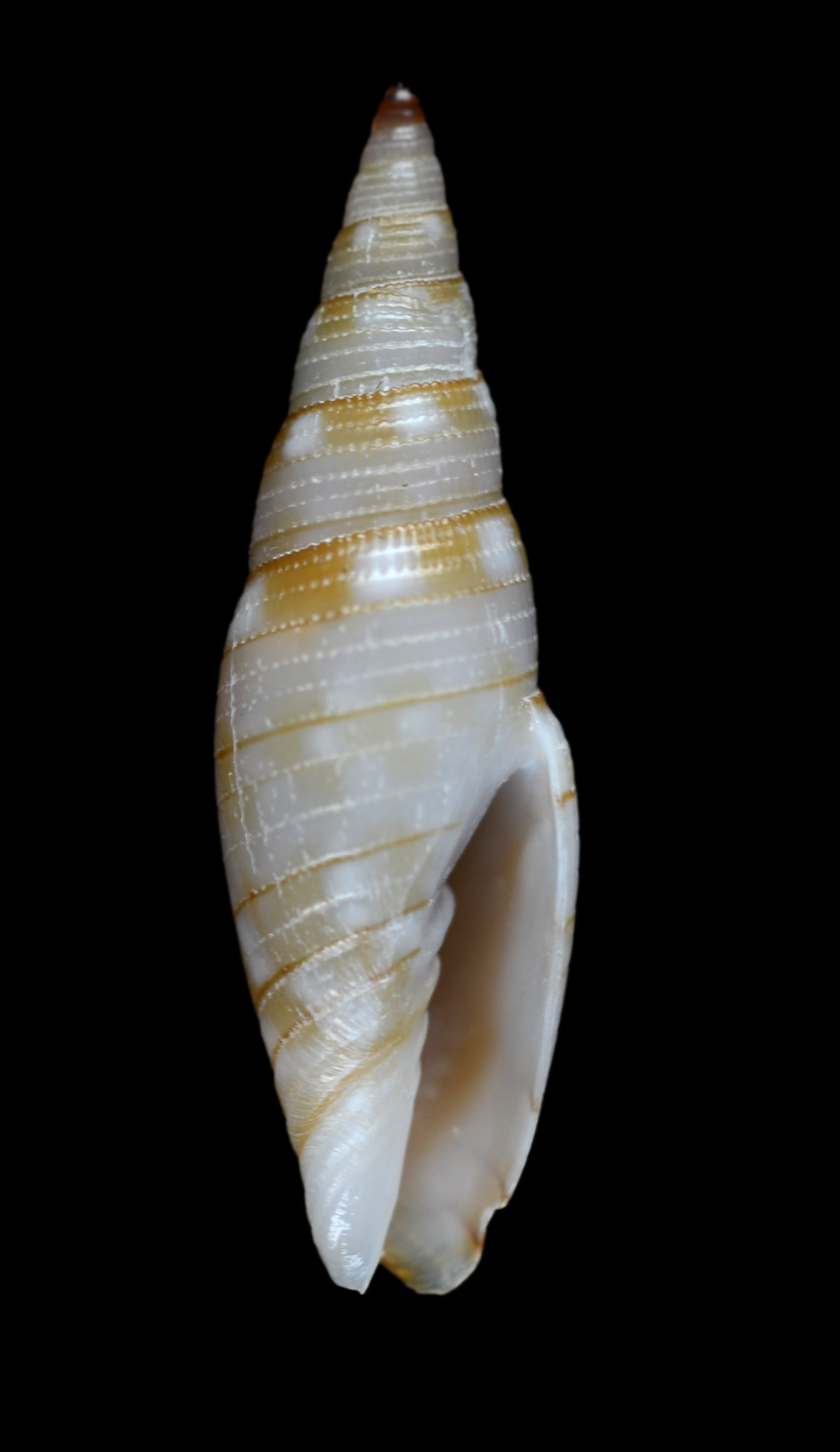
- Shell of Cancilla schepmani (specimen at MNHN, Paris)

Scientific classification
- Kingdom: Animalia
- Phylum: Mollusca
- Class: Gastropoda
- Subclass: Caenogastropoda
- Order: Neogastropoda
- Family: Mitridae
- Genus: Cancilla
- Species: C. schepmani

Binomial name
- Cancilla schepmani (Salisbury & Guillot de Suduiraut, 2003)

Synonyms
- Mitra (Mitra) schepmani R. Salisbury & Guillot de Suduiraut, 2003 (basionym); Mitra millepunctata Schepman, 1911 (invalid: junior homonym of Mitra millepunctata G.B. Sowerby III, 1889; Mitra schepmani is a replacement name); Mitra schepmani Salisbury & Guillot de Suduiraut, 2003; Scabricola (Swainsonia) schepmani (R. Salisbury & Guillot de Suduiraut, 2003); Swainsonia millepunctata (Schepman, 1911); Swainsonia schepmani (R. Salisbury & Guillot de Suduiraut, 2003)

= Cancilla schepmani =

Species of gastropod

Cancilla schepmani is a species of sea snail, a marine gastropod mollusk in the family Mitridae, the miters or miter snails.

The specific name schepmani is in honor of Dutch malacologist Mattheus Marinus Schepman.

== Distribution ==
This marine species occurs off New Caledonia and Sulu Island, Indonesia
