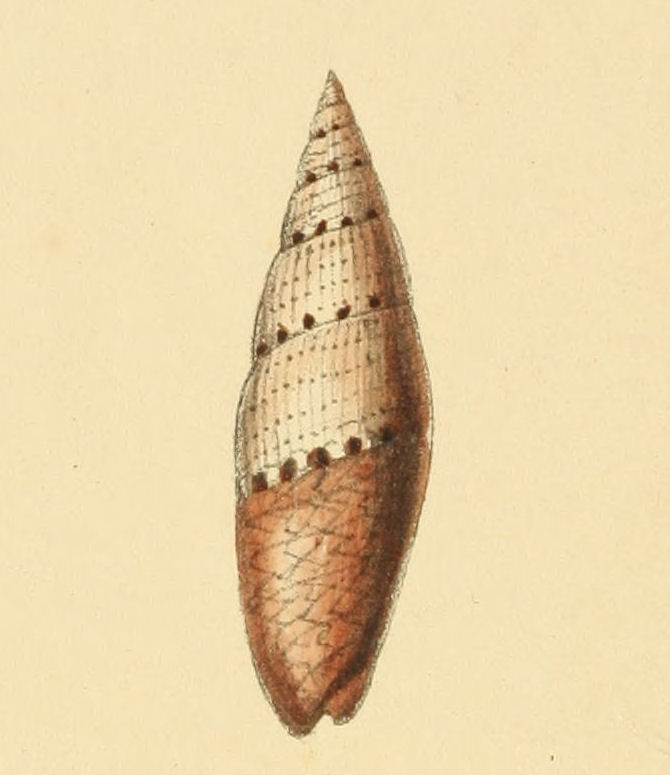

Scientific classification
- Kingdom: Animalia
- Phylum: Mollusca
- Class: Gastropoda
- Subclass: Caenogastropoda
- Order: Neogastropoda
- Family: Mitridae
- Genus: Swainsonia
- Species: S. ocellata

Binomial name
- Swainsonia ocellata (Swainson, 1831)

Synonyms
- Mitra ocellata Swainson, 1831 (original combination); Scabricola (Swainsonia) ocellata (Swainson, 1831); Scabricola (Swainsonia) ocellata ocellata (Swainson, 1831); Scabricola ocellata (Swainson, 1831); Swainsonia mariae (A. Adams, 1853); Swainsonia ocellata f. mariae (A. Adams, 1853)

= Swainsonia ocellata =

Species of gastropod

Swainsonia ocellata, common name the eyed mitre, is a species of sea snail, a marine gastropod mollusc in the family Mitridae, the miters or miter snails.

== Subspecies ==
- Swainsonia ocellata ocellata (Swainson, 1831)
- Swainsonia ocellata sublevigata (Bozzetti, 2016)

== Description ==
The length of the shell varies between 13 mm and 34 mm. The shell is roughly spindle-shaped, white towards the apex and brown towards the base, with striations and a row of reddish spots.

== Distribution ==
This marine species occurs in the Indo-West Pacific; also off Madagascar
