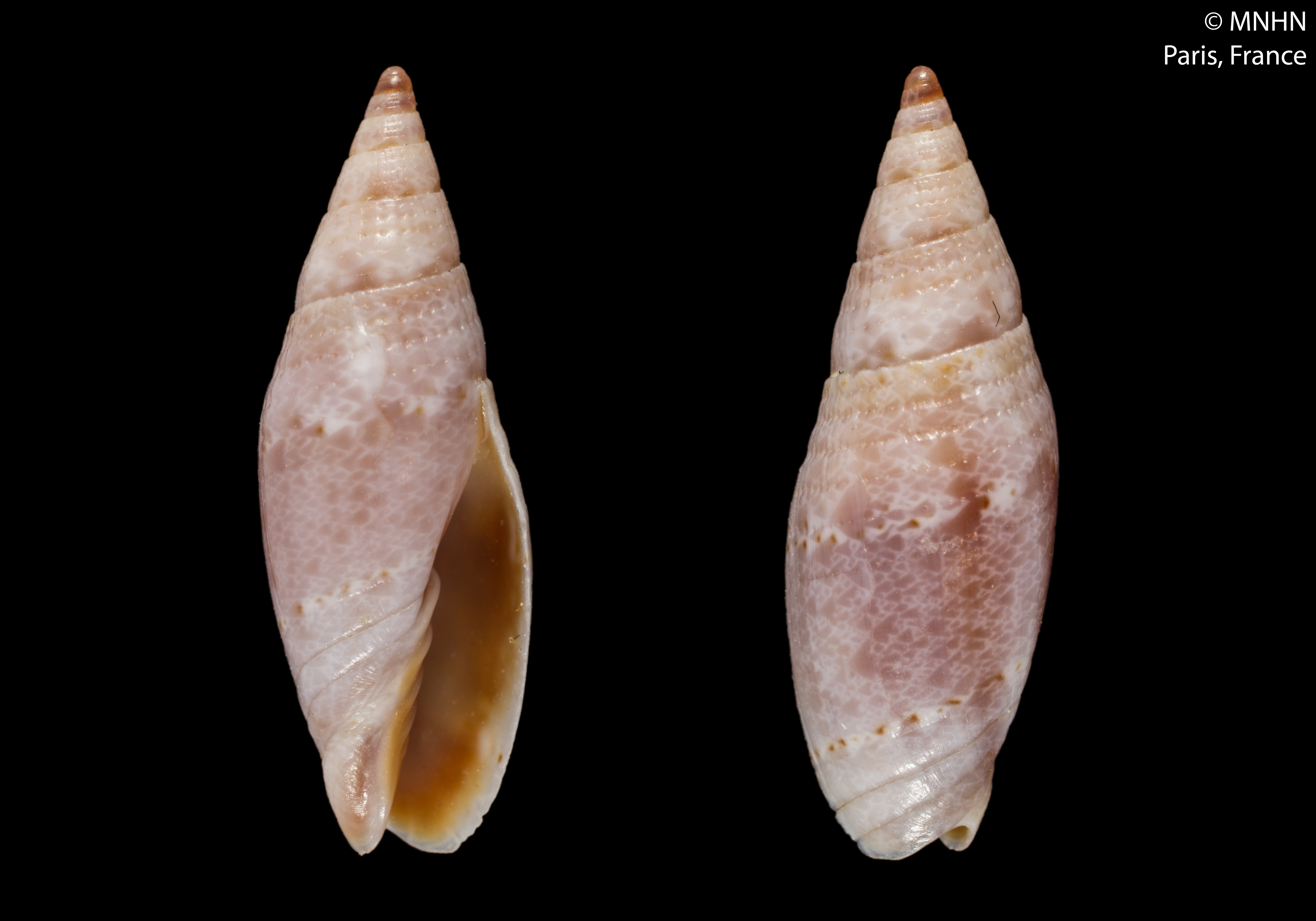
- Shell of Swainsonia biconica (holotype at MNHN, Paris)

Scientific classification
- Kingdom: Animalia
- Phylum: Mollusca
- Class: Gastropoda
- Subclass: Caenogastropoda
- Order: Neogastropoda
- Superfamily: Mitroidea
- Family: Mitridae
- Subfamily: Imbricariinae
- Genus: Swainsonia
- Species: S. biconica

Binomial name
- Swainsonia biconica (Bozzetti, 2011)

Synonyms
- Scabricola (Swainsonia) biconica Bozzetti, 2011; Scabricola biconica Bozzetti, 2011

= Swainsonia biconica =

Species of gastropod

Swainsonia biconica is a species of sea snail, a marine gastropod mollusk, in the family Mitridae, the miters or miter snails.

== Description ==
The length of the shell attains 17.15 mm.

== Distribution ==
This marine species occurs off Madagascar.
