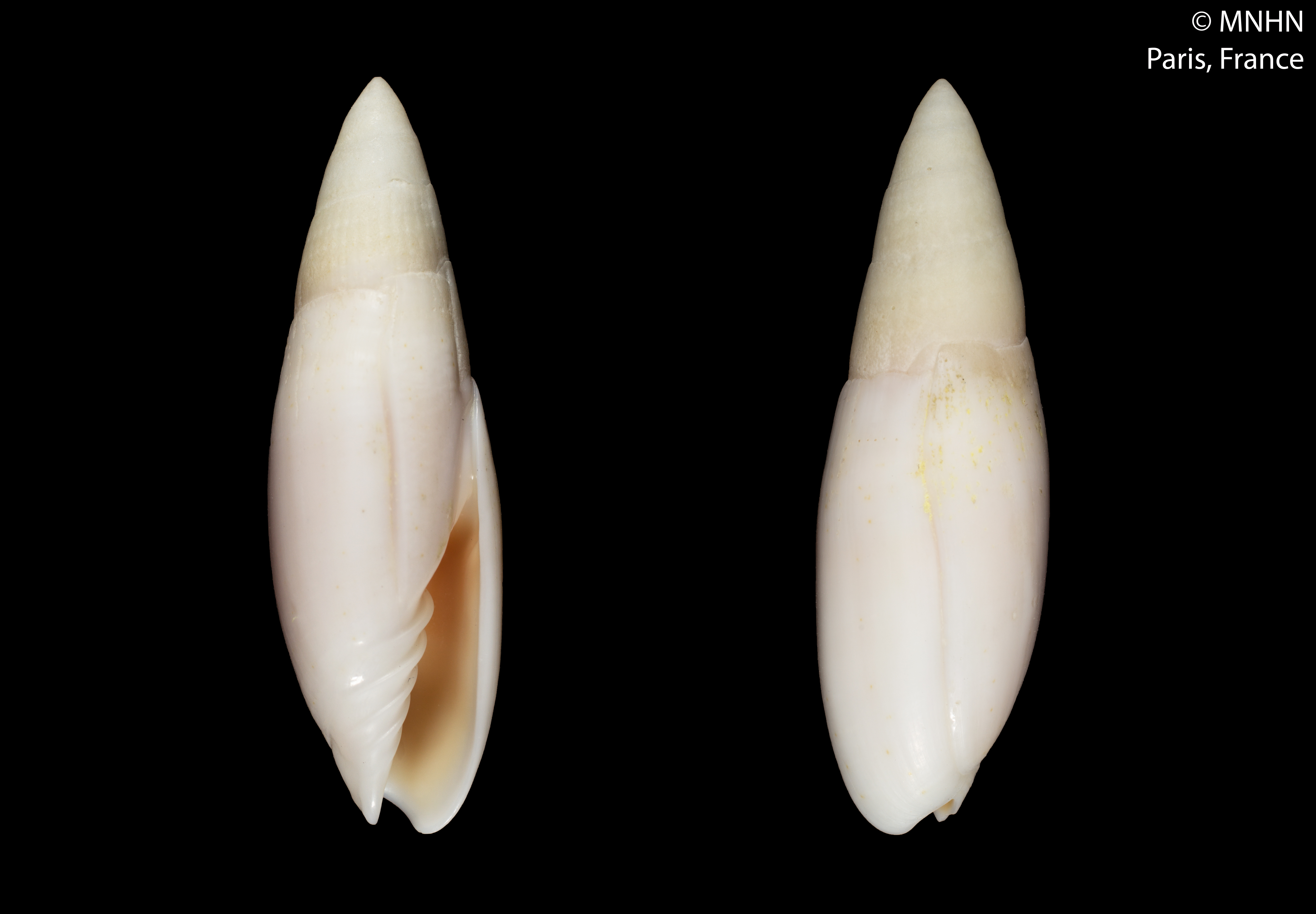
- Shell of Swainsonia newcombii (holotype at MNHN, Paris)

Scientific classification
- Kingdom: Animalia
- Phylum: Mollusca
- Class: Gastropoda
- Subclass: Caenogastropoda
- Order: Neogastropoda
- Family: Mitridae
- Subfamily: Imbricariinae
- Genus: Swainsonia
- Species: S. newcombii

Binomial name
- Swainsonia newcombii (Pease, 1869)

Synonyms
- Mitra newcombii Pease, 1869 (original combination); Scabricola (Swainsonia) newcombii (Pease, 1869); Scabricola newcombii (Pease, 1869)

= Swainsonia newcombii =

Species of gastropod

Swainsonia newcombii, common name Newcomb's mitre, is a species of sea snail, a marine gastropod mollusk in the family Mitridae, the miters or miter snails.

Subspecies

- Swainsonia newcombii irisae (Le Béon, 2014)
- Swainsonia newcombii newcombii (Pease, 1869)

== Description ==
The length of the shell varies between 20 mm and 41 mm.

== Distribution ==
This marine species is known to be living off of Hawaii, Midway, New Caledonia and Tanzania.
