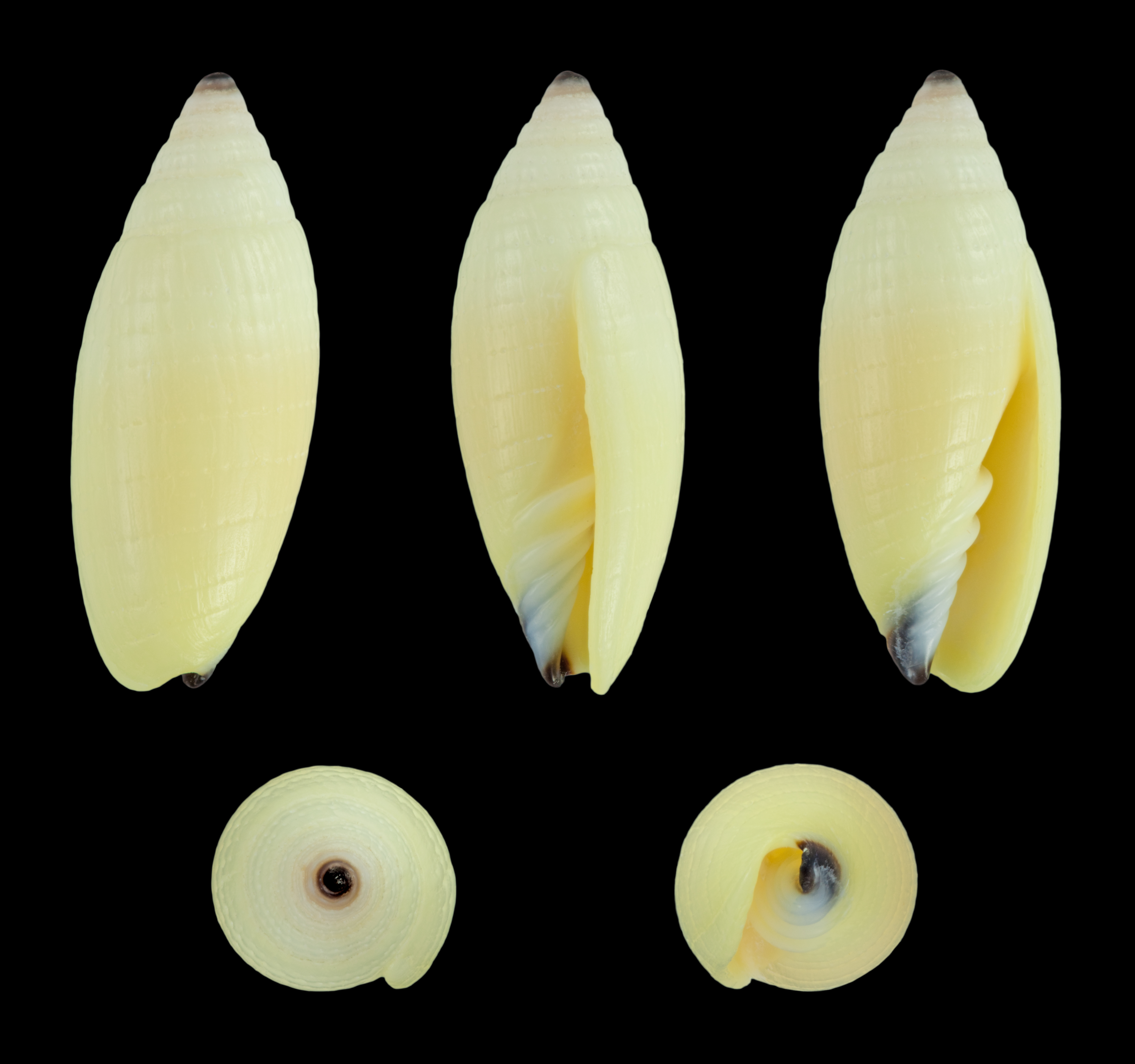

Scientific classification
- Kingdom: Animalia
- Phylum: Mollusca
- Class: Gastropoda
- Subclass: Caenogastropoda
- Order: Neogastropoda
- Family: Mitridae
- Genus: Scabricola
- Species: S. olivaeformis

Binomial name
- Scabricola olivaeformis (Swainson, 1821)

Synonyms
- Imbricaria olivaeformis (Swainson, 1821); Mitra dactyloidea Anton, H.E., 1838; Mitra olivaeformis Swainson, 1821 (original combination); Mitra olivellaeformis Pilsbry, H.A., 1920; Scabricola (Swainsonia) olivaeformis (Swainson, 1821) ·; Swainsonia olivaeformis (Swainson, 1821)

= Scabricola olivaeformis =

Species of gastropod

Scabricola olivaeformis, common name the olive-shaped mitre, is a species of sea snail, a marine gastropod mollusk in the family Mitridae, the miter shells or miter snails.

== Distribution ==
This species occurs in the Indo-Pacific off the Mascarene Basin and Réunion; in the Pacific Ocean off the Philippines, Hawaii, Australia, Papua New Guinea, Japan and Okinawa

== Description ==
The length of the shell varies between 7 mm and 21 mm
