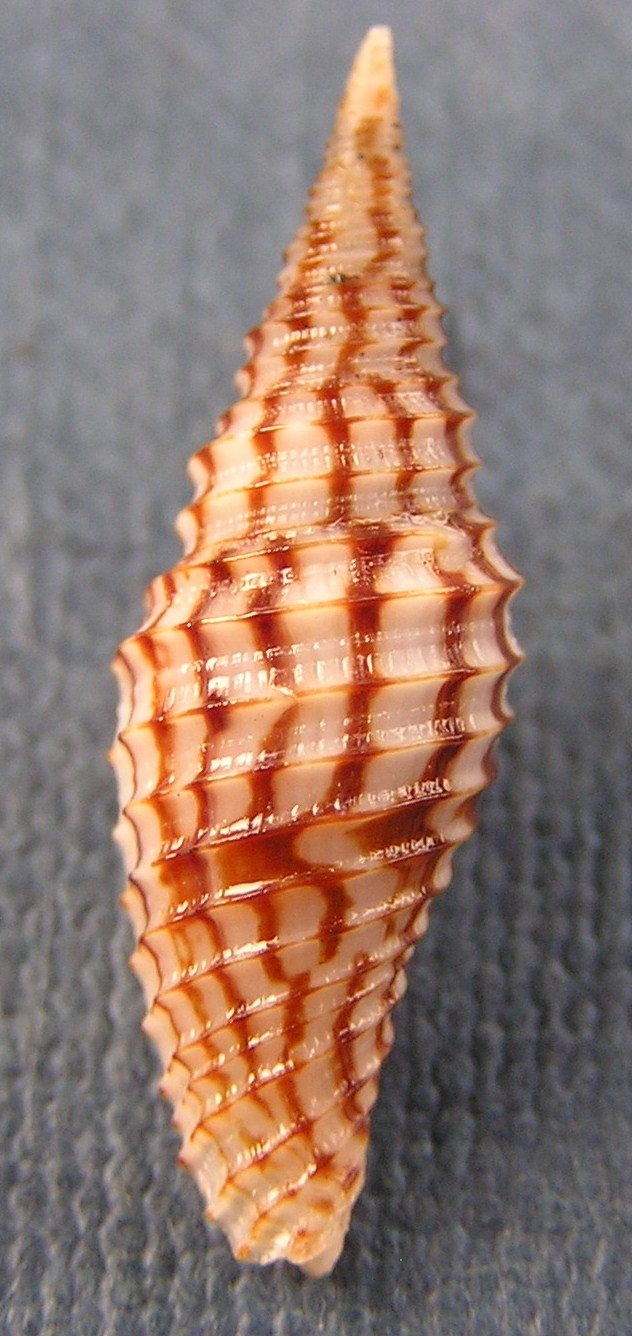
- Subcancilla hrdlickai

Scientific classification
- Kingdom: Animalia
- Phylum: Mollusca
- Class: Gastropoda
- Subclass: Caenogastropoda
- Order: Neogastropoda
- Superfamily: Mitroidea
- Family: Mitridae
- Genus: Subcancilla; Olsson & Harbison, 1953

Type species
- Mitra sulcata Swainson, 1825

Species
- See text

Synonyms
- Mitra (Subcancilla) Olsson & Harbison, 1953

= Subcancilla =

Genus of gastropods

Subcancilla is a genus of sea snails, marine gastropod molluscs in the subfamily Isarinae of the family Mitridae.

== Species ==
Species within the genus Subcancilla include:

- Subcancilla attenuata (Broderip, 1836)
- Subcancilla belcheri (Hinds, 1843)
- Subcancilla calodinota (S. S. Berry, 1960)
- Subcancilla candida (Reeve, 1845)
- Subcancilla directa (Berry, 1960)
- Subcancilla edithrexae Sphon, 1976
- Subcancilla erythrogramma (Tomlin, 1931)
- Subcancilla foveolata (Dunker, 1863) (temporary name)
- Subcancilla funiculata (Reeve, 1844)
- Subcancilla gigantea (Reeve, 1844)
- Subcancilla haneti (Petit de la Saussaye, 1852)
- Subcancilla hindsii (Reeve, 1844)
- Subcancilla joapyra Simone & Cunha, 2012
- Subcancilla larranagai (Carcelles, 1947)
- Subcancilla leonardhilli Petuch, 1987
- Subcancilla leonardi (Petuch, 1990)
- Subcancilla lindae Petuch, 1987
- Subcancilla lopesi (Matthews & Coelho, 1969)
- Subcancilla malleti (Petit de la Saussaye, 1852)
- Subcancilla phorminx (S. S. Berry, 1969)
- Subcancilla pia (Dohrn, 1860) (temporary name)
- Subcancilla rhadina (Woodring, 1928) (temporary name)
- † Subcancilla scrobiculata (Brocchi, 1814)
- Subcancilla sulcata (Swainson, 1825)

Species brought into synonymy

- Subcancilla abyssicola: synonym of Profundimitra abyssicola (Schepman, 1911)
- Subcancilla amoena (A. Adams, 1853): synonym of Imbricaria amoena (A. Adams, 1853)
- Subcancilla annulata: synonym of Imbricaria annulata (Reeve, 1844)
- Subcancilla baisei: synonym of Imbricaria baisei Poppe, Tagaro & Salisbury, 2009
- Subcancilla bellulavaria: synonym of Imbricaria bellulavaria Dekkers, Herrmann, Poppe & Tagaro, 2014
- Subcancilla circula (Kiener, 1838): synonym of Domiporta circula (Kiener, 1838)
- Subcancilla fibula: synonym of Cancilla fibula Poppe, Tagaro & Salisbury, 2009
- Subcancilla filaris (Linnaeus, 1771): synonym of Domiporta filaris (Linnaeus, 1771)
- Subcancilla flammea: synonym of Imbricaria flammea (Quoy & Gaimard, 1833)
- Subcancilla hidalgoi (G. B. Sowerby III, 1913): synonym of Imbricaria hidalgoi (G. B. Sowerby III, 1913)
- Subcancilla hrdlickai: synonym of Imbricaria hrdlickai (Salisbury, 1994)
- Subcancilla insculpta: synonym of Imbricaria insculpta (A. Adams, 1853)
- Subcancilla interlirata: synonym of Imbricaria interlirata (Reeve, 1844)
- Subcancilla juttingae Koperberg, 1931: synonym of Gemmulimitra duplilirata (Reeve, 1845)
- Subcancilla lichtlei Herrmann & R. Salisbury, 2012: synonym of Domiporta lichtlei (Herrmann & R. Salisbury, 2012) (original combination)
- Subcancilla lindsayi (Berry, 1960): synonym of Subcancilla calodinota (S. S. Berry, 1960)
- Subcancilla philpoppei: synonym of Imbricaria philpoppei Poppe, Tagaro & Salisbury, 2009
- Subcancilla praestantissima: synonym of Domiporta praestantissima (Röding, 1798)
- Subcancilla pugnaxa: synonym of Imbricaria pugnaxa Poppe, Tagaro & Salisbury, 2009
- Subcancilla ruberorbis: synonym of Imbricaria ruberorbis (Dekkers, Herrmann, Poppe & Tagaro, 2014)
- Subcancilla rufescens (A. Adams, 1853): synonym of Neocancilla rufescens (A. Adams, 1853)
- Subcancilla rufogyrata: synonym of Imbricaria rufogyrata Poppe, Tagaro & Salisbury, 2009
- Subcancilla salisburyi (Drivas & Jay, 1990): synonym of Imbricaria salisburyi (Drivas & Jay, 1990)
- Subcancilla shikamai (Habe, 1980): synonym of Domiporta shikamai Habe, 1980
- Subcancilla straminea (A. Adams, 1853): synonym of Isara straminea (A. Adams, 1853)
- Subcancilla tahitiensis Herrmann & R. Salisbury, 2012: synonym of Imbricaria tahitiensis (Herrmann & R. Salisbury, 2012) (original combination)
- Subcancilla turneri: synonym of Cancilla turneri Poppe, Tagaro & Salisbury, 2009
- Subcancilla verrucosa (Reeve, 1845): synonym of Imbricaria verrucosa (Reeve, 1845)
- Subcancilla welkerorum Whitney, 1977: synonym of Ziba erythrogramma (Tomlin, 1931): synonym of Subcancilla erythrogramma (Tomlin, 1931)
- Subcancilla yagurai (Kira, 1959): synonym of Imbricaria yagurai (Kira, 1959)
- Subcancilla zetema: synonym of Imbricaria zetema (Dekkers, Herrmann, Poppe & Tagaro, 2014)
