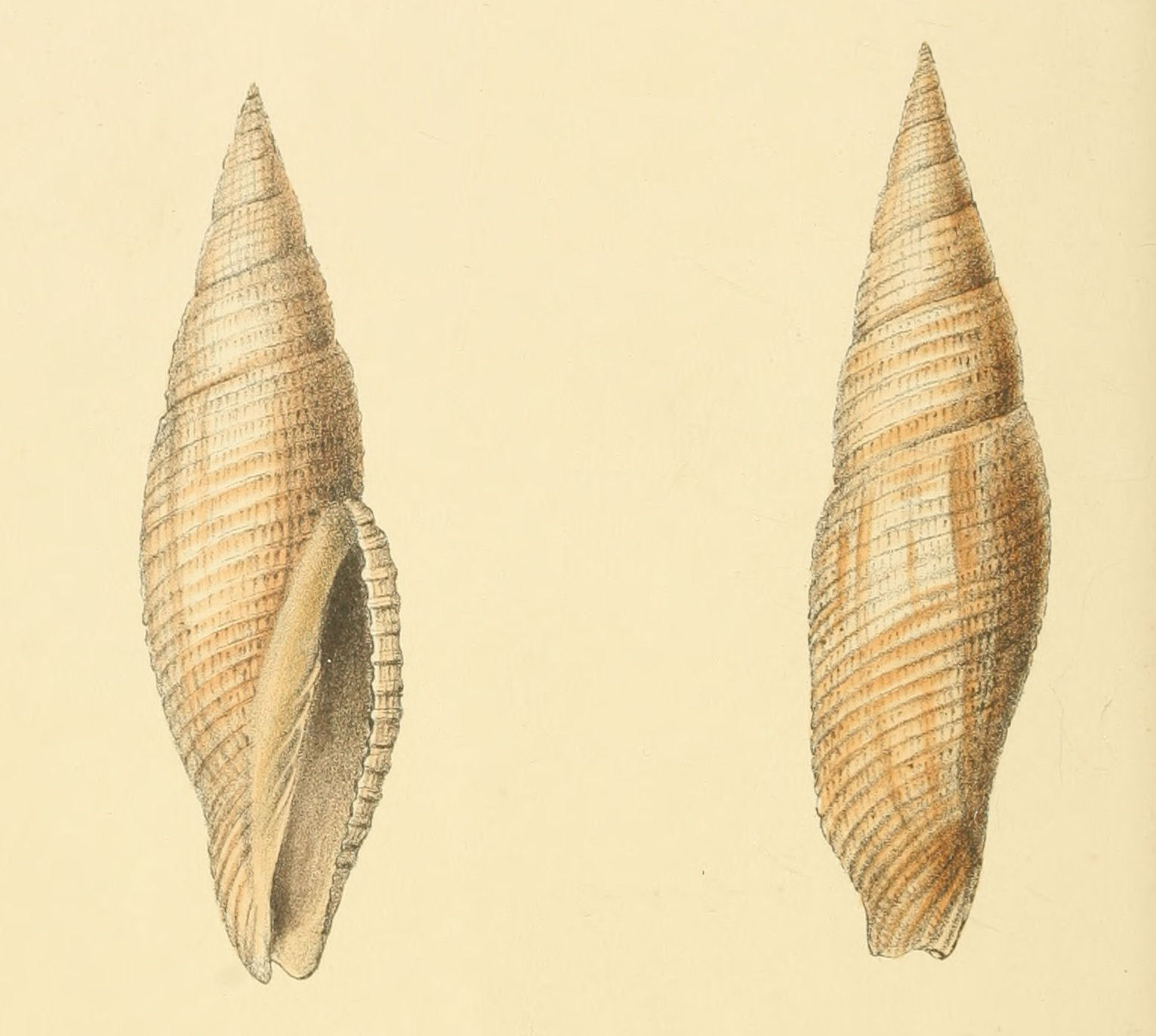
- Drawing with two views of a shell of Cancilla isabella

Scientific classification
- Kingdom: Animalia
- Phylum: Mollusca
- Class: Gastropoda
- Subclass: Caenogastropoda
- Order: Neogastropoda
- Family: Mitridae
- Subfamily: Imbricariinae
- Genus: Cancilla; Swainson, 1840

Type species
- Tiara isabella Swainson, 1831

Synonyms
- Mitra (Cancilla); Tiara (Cancilla) Swainson, 1840

= Cancilla =

Genus of gastropods

Cancilla is a genus of sea snails, marine gastropod mollusks in the family Mitridae.

== Description ==
The slender shell has a fusiform shape.The spire is acuminate. The whorls are crossed by transverse, linear, elevated ridges. The aperture is simple posteriorly. The thin outer lip is simple.

== Species ==
Species within the genus Cancilla include:

- Cancilla baeri (Turner & Cernohorsky, 2003)
- Cancilla chihsiungi S.-I Huang & Q.-Y. Chuo, 2019
- Cancilla fallowense Marrow, 2020
- Cancilla fibula Poppe, Tagaro & Salisbury, 2009
- Cancilla heinickei (Salisbury & Guillot de Suduiraut, 2003)
- Cancilla herrmanni Dekkers, 2014
- Cancilla isabella Swainson, 1831
- Cancilla rehderi (J.H. Webb, 1958)
- Cancilla rikae (Guillot de Suduiraut, 2004)
- Cancilla schepmani (Salisbury & Guillot de Suduiraut, 2003)
- Cancilla suni S.-I Huang & Q.-Y. Chuo, 2019
- Cancilla turneri Poppe, Tagaro & Salisbury, 2009

Taxa inquirenda

- Cancilla beyerlei Jousseaume, 1894
- Cancilla innesi Jousseaume, 1894
- Cancilla sura Jousseaume, 1898

Species brought into synonymy

- Subgenus Cancilla (Domiporta) Cernohorsky, 1970: synonym of Domiporta Cernohorsky, 1970
- Cancilla abyssicola: synonym of Profundimitra abyssicola (Schepman, 1911)
- Cancilla aegra: synonym of Nebularia aegra (Reeve, 1845)
- Cancilla antoniae Adams, H.G., 1870 : synonym of Neocancilla pretiosa (Reeve, 1844)
- Cancilla apprimapex: synonym of Gemmulimitra apprimapex Poppe, Tagaro & Salisbury, 2009
- Cancilla armonica: synonym of Imbricaria armonica (T. Cossignani & V. Cossignani, 2005)
- Cancilla carnicolor (Reeve, 1844): synonym of Domiporta carnicolor (Reeve, 1844)
- Cancilla citharoidea (Dohrn, 1862): synonym of Domiporta citharoidea (Dohrn, 1862)
- Cancilla cloveri Cernohorsky, 1971 : synonym of Swainsonia cloveri (Cernohorsky, 1971)
- Cancilla duplilirata: synonym of Gemmulimitra duplilirata (Reeve, 1845)
- Cancilla filaris (Linnaeus, 1771): synonym of Domiporta filaris (Linnaeus, 1771)
- Cancilla gloriola (Cernohorsky, 1970): synonym of Domiporta gloriola (Cernohorsky, 1970)
- Cancilla granatina (Lamarck, 1811): synonym of Domiporta granatina (Lamarck, 1811)
- Cancilla larranagai (Carcelles, 1947): synonym of Subcancilla larranagai (Carcelles, 1947)
- Cancilla liliformis Huang & Salisbury, 2017: synonym of Cancillopsis liliformis (S.-I Huang & R. Salisbury, 2017) (original combination)
- Cancilla meyeriana: synonym of Calcimitra meyeriana (Salisbury, 1992)
- Cancilla planofilum: synonym of Profundimitra planofilum Huang, 2011
- Cancilla praestantissima (Röding, 1758): synonym of Subcancilla praestantissima (Röding, 1798)
- Cancilla rufilirata (Adams & Reeve, 1850): synonym of Domiporta rufilirata (Adams & Reeve, 1850)
- Cancilla scrobiculata: synonym of Subcancilla scrobiculata (Brocchi, 1814) †
- Cancilla shikamai (Habe, 1980): synonym of Domiporta shikamai Habe, 1980
- Cancilla sigillata (Azuma, 1965): synonym of Domiporta sigillata (Azuma, 1965)
- Cancilla strangei (Angas, 1867): synonym of Roseomitra strangei (Angas, 1867)
- Cancilla turtoni (Smith, 1890): synonym of Ziba gambiana (Dohrn, 1861)
