= Z. candida =

Z. candida may refer to:

- Zephyranthes candida, the white fairy lily or white rain lily, a plant species native to the Rio de la Plata region of South America
- Ziba candida, a sea snail species

== See also ==
- Candida (disambiguation)
