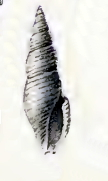
- Original image of a shell of Daphnella cecilliae

Scientific classification
- Kingdom: Animalia
- Phylum: Mollusca
- Class: Gastropoda
- Subclass: Caenogastropoda
- Order: Neogastropoda
- Superfamily: Conoidea
- Family: Raphitomidae
- Genus: Daphnella
- Species: D. cecilliae

Binomial name
- Daphnella cecilliae Melvill & Standen, 1901

= Daphnella cecilliae =

Species of gastropod

Daphnella cecilliae is a species of sea snail, a marine gastropod mollusk in the family Raphitomidae.

== Description ==
The length of the shell attains 13 mm, its diameter 4 mm.

A most graceful white fusiform species, resembling a mitra of the genus Cancilla. It contains nine whorls of which three straw-colored in the protoconch. On the fourth and fifth whorls the longitudinal ribs are fewer and more incrassate than on the penultimate and body whorl. The same with the spiral lirae. On the body whorl these lirae are of varying thickness, the interstices are alveate. The whitish aperture is oblong. The outer lip is slightly incrassate. The sinus is not deep. The columella stands upright.

== Distribution ==
This marine species occurs in the Gulf of Oman.
