= Isara carbonaria =

Scientific classification
- Kingdom: Animalia
- Phylum: Mollusca
- Class: Gastropoda
- Subclass: Caenogastropoda
- Order: Neogastropoda
- Family: Mitridae
- Genus: Isara
- Species: I. carbonaria

Binomial name
- Isara carbonaria (Swainson, 1822)

Synonyms
- Mitra carbonaria Swainson, 1822; Mitra nigra Reeve, 1844; Mitra rhodia Reeve, 1844; Mitra digna A. Adams, 1853; Mitra maoria Finlay, 1927; Vicimitra contermina Iredale, 1936; Mitra sinusigera Laseron, 1951

Species of mollusc

Isara carbonaria is a medium-large species of sea snail, a marine gastropod mollusc in the family Mitridae, the mitre snails or mitre shells.

== Description ==
A dark, slim species with an acuminated spire slightly exceeding the aperture in length.

== Distribution ==
This species occurs in Australia and New Zealand.
