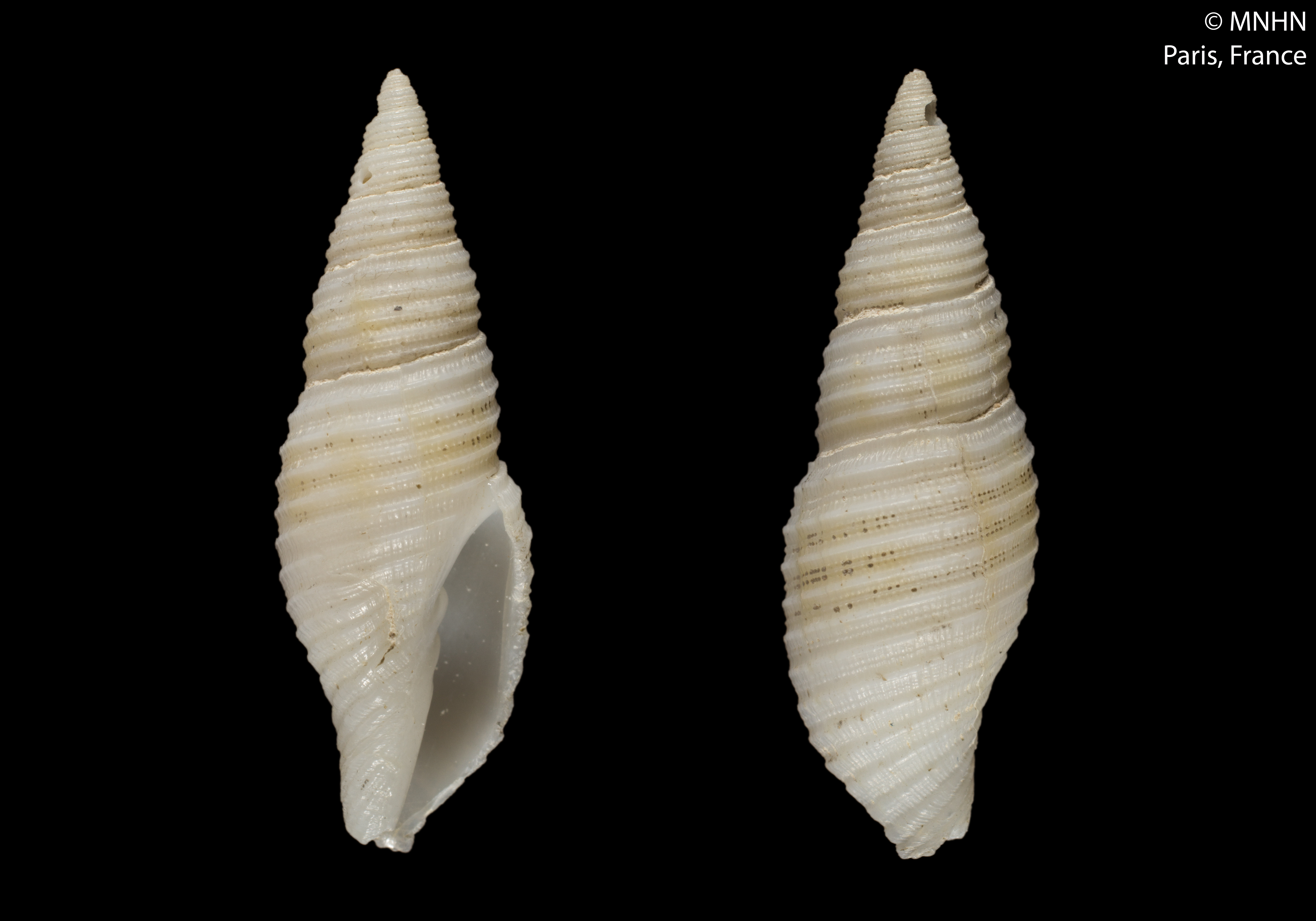
- Shell of Subcancilla joapyra (holotype at MNHN, Paris)

Scientific classification
- Kingdom: Animalia
- Phylum: Mollusca
- Class: Gastropoda
- Subclass: Caenogastropoda
- Order: Neogastropoda
- Superfamily: Mitroidea
- Family: Mitridae
- Genus: Subcancilla
- Species: S. joapyra

Binomial name
- Subcancilla joapyra Simone & Cunha, 2012

= Subcancilla joapyra =

Species of gastropod

Subcancilla joapyra is a species of sea snail, a marine gastropod mollusk, in the family Mitridae, the miters or miter snails.

== Description ==
The length of the shell attains 23.3 mm.

== Distribution ==
This species occur in the Atlantic Ocean off Southeast Brazil.
