= Isara aerumnosa =

Scientific classification
- Kingdom: Animalia
- Phylum: Mollusca
- Class: Gastropoda
- Subclass: Caenogastropoda
- Order: Neogastropoda
- Family: Mitridae
- Genus: Isara
- Species: I. aerumnosa

Binomial name
- Isara aerumnosa (Melvill, 1888)

Synonyms
- Mitra aerumnosa Melvill, 1888

Species of gastropod

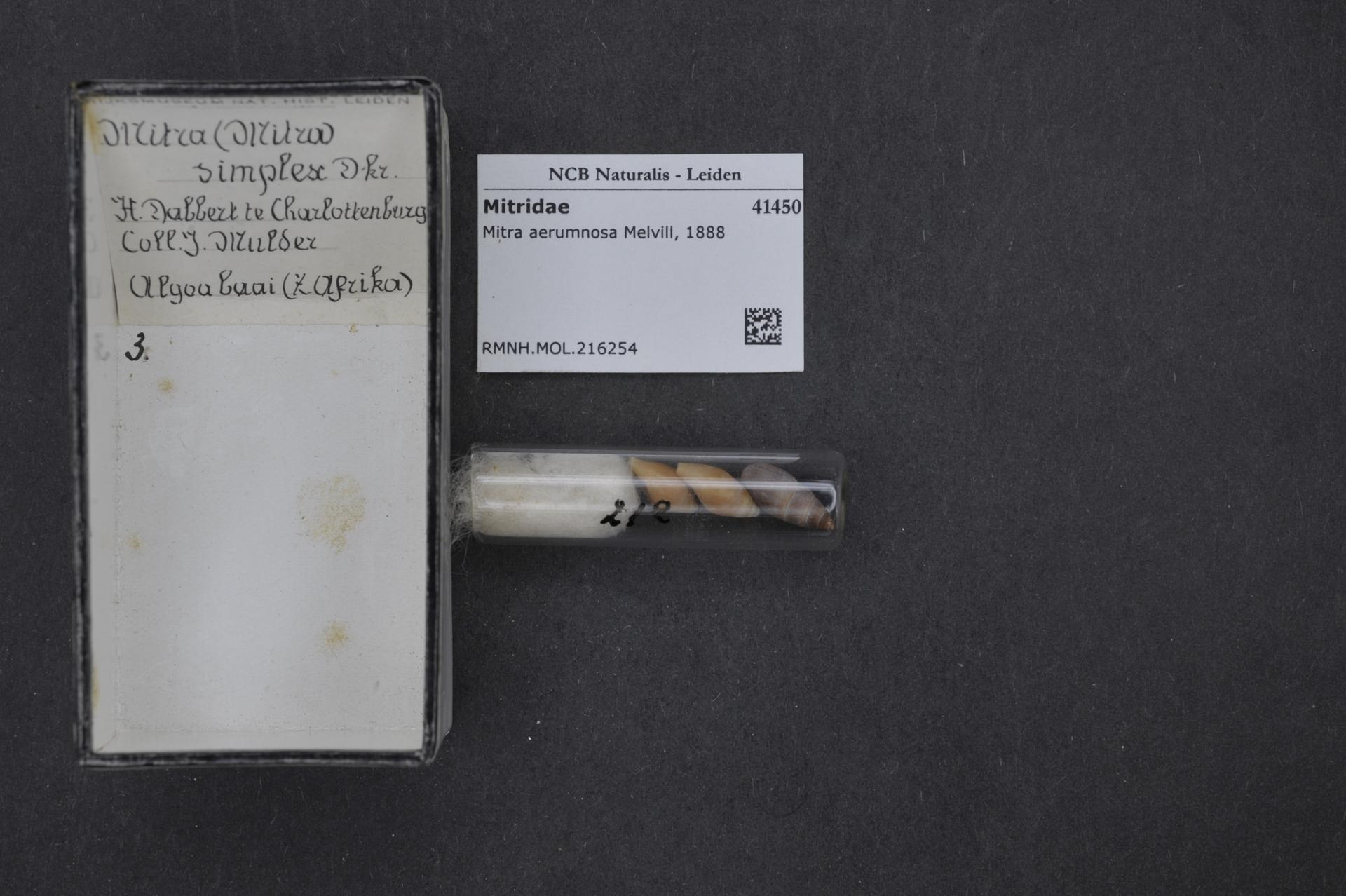
Mitra aerumnosa Melvill, 1888

Isara aerumnosa is a species of sea snail, a marine gastropod mollusk in the family Mitridae, the miters or miter snails.
