= Isara picta =

Scientific classification
- Kingdom: Animalia
- Phylum: Mollusca
- Class: Gastropoda
- Subclass: Caenogastropoda
- Order: Neogastropoda
- Family: Mitridae
- Genus: Isara
- Species: I. picta

Binomial name
- Isara picta (Reeve, 1844)

Synonyms
- Mitra picta Reeve, 1844

Species of gastropod

Isara picta, common name the brown mitre, is a species of sea snail, a marine gastropod mollusk in the family Mitridae, the miters or miter snails.

== Description ==
The Isara picta is a snail with a cone shaped shell ranging in 20 – 40 mm in length. The color of the shell can range from deep brown to a light tan.
