= Isara declivis =

Scientific classification
- Kingdom: Animalia
- Phylum: Mollusca
- Class: Gastropoda
- Subclass: Caenogastropoda
- Order: Neogastropoda
- Superfamily: Mitroidea
- Family: Mitridae
- Subfamily: Isarinae
- Genus: Isara
- Species: I. declivis

Binomial name
- Isara declivis (Reeve, 1844)

Synonyms
- Mitra declivis Reeve, 1844

Species of gastropod

Isara declivis is a species of sea snail, a marine gastropod mollusk, in the family Mitridae, the miters or miter snails.
