= Subcancilla phorminx =

Scientific classification
- Kingdom: Animalia
- Phylum: Mollusca
- Class: Gastropoda
- Subclass: Caenogastropoda
- Order: Neogastropoda
- Family: Mitridae
- Genus: Subcancilla
- Species: S. phorminx

Binomial name
- Subcancilla phorminx (S.S. Berry, 1969)

Synonyms
- Ziba phorminx (S.S. Berry, 1969)

Species of gastropod

Subcancilla phorminx is a species of sea snail, a marine gastropod mollusk in the family Mitridae, the miters or miter snails.
