= Isara peterclarksoni =

Scientific classification
- Kingdom: Animalia
- Phylum: Mollusca
- Class: Gastropoda
- Subclass: Caenogastropoda
- Order: Neogastropoda
- Superfamily: Mitroidea
- Family: Mitridae
- Subfamily: Isarinae
- Genus: Isara
- Species: I. peterclarksoni

Binomial name
- Isara peterclarksoni (Marrow, 2013)

Synonyms
- Mitra (Mitra) peterclarksoni Marrow, 2013; Mitra peterclarksoni Marrow, 2013

Species of sea snail

Isara peterclarksoni is a species of sea snail, a marine gastropod mollusk, in the family Mitridae, the miters or miter snails.
