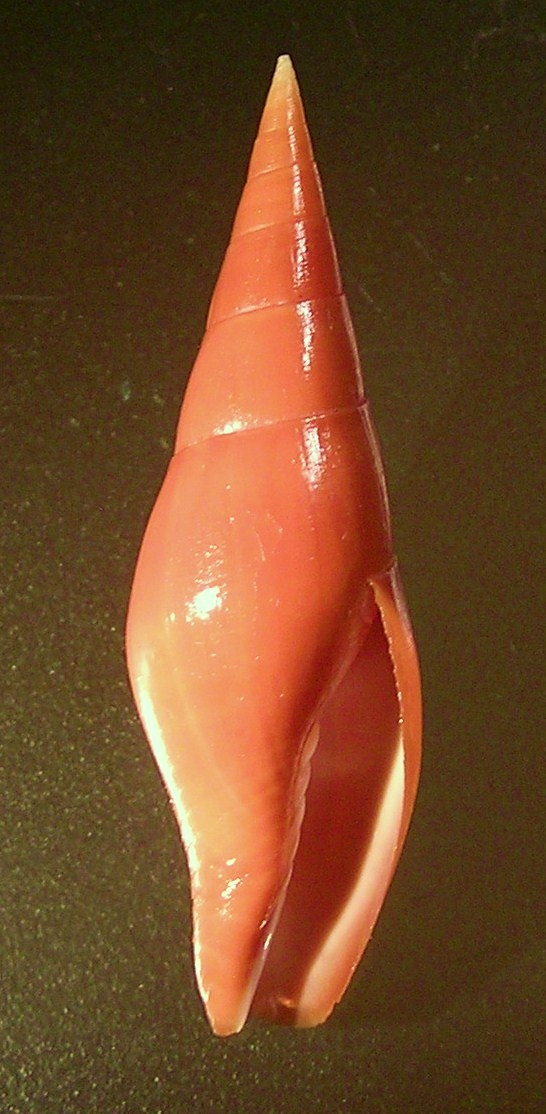

Scientific classification
- Kingdom: Animalia
- Phylum: Mollusca
- Class: Gastropoda
- Subclass: Caenogastropoda
- Order: Neogastropoda
- Family: Mitridae
- Genus: Isara
- Species: I. pele

Binomial name
- Isara pele (Cernohorsky, 1970)

Synonyms
- Mitra pele Cernohorsky, 1970

= Isara pele =

Species of gastropod

Isara pele is a species of sea snail, a marine gastropod mollusk in the family Mitridae, the miters or miter snails.
