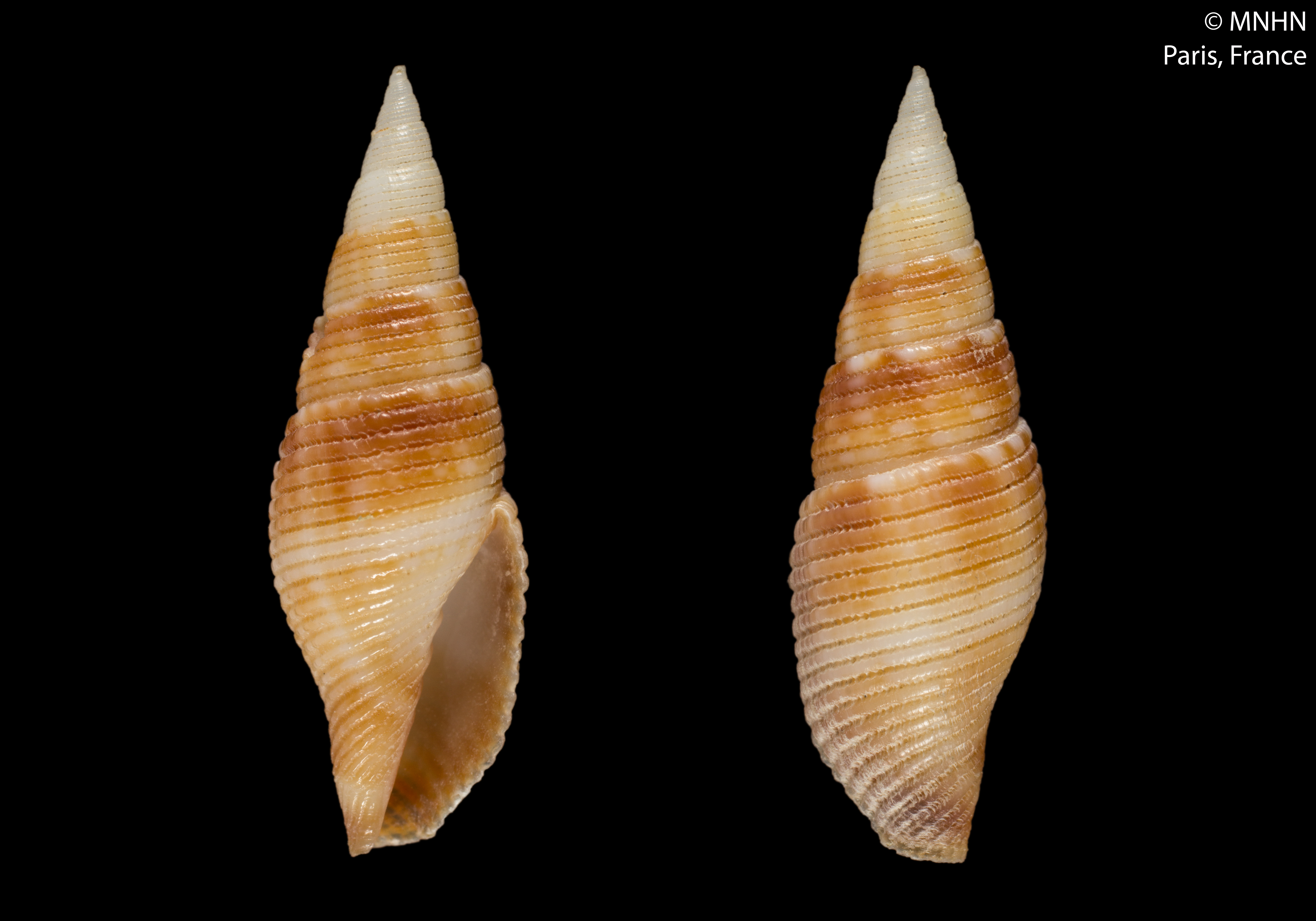
- Shell of Cancilla rikae (holotype at MNHN, Paris)

Scientific classification
- Kingdom: Animalia
- Phylum: Mollusca
- Class: Gastropoda
- Subclass: Caenogastropoda
- Order: Neogastropoda
- Family: Mitridae
- Genus: Cancilla
- Species: C. rikae

Binomial name
- Cancilla rikae (Guillot de Suduiraut, 2004)

Synonyms
- Neocancilla rikae Guillot de Suduiraut, 2004

= Cancilla rikae =

Species of gastropod

Cancilla rikae is a species of sea snail, a marine gastropod mollusk in the family Mitridae, the miters or miter snails.

== Distribution ==
This marine species occurs off the Philippines.
