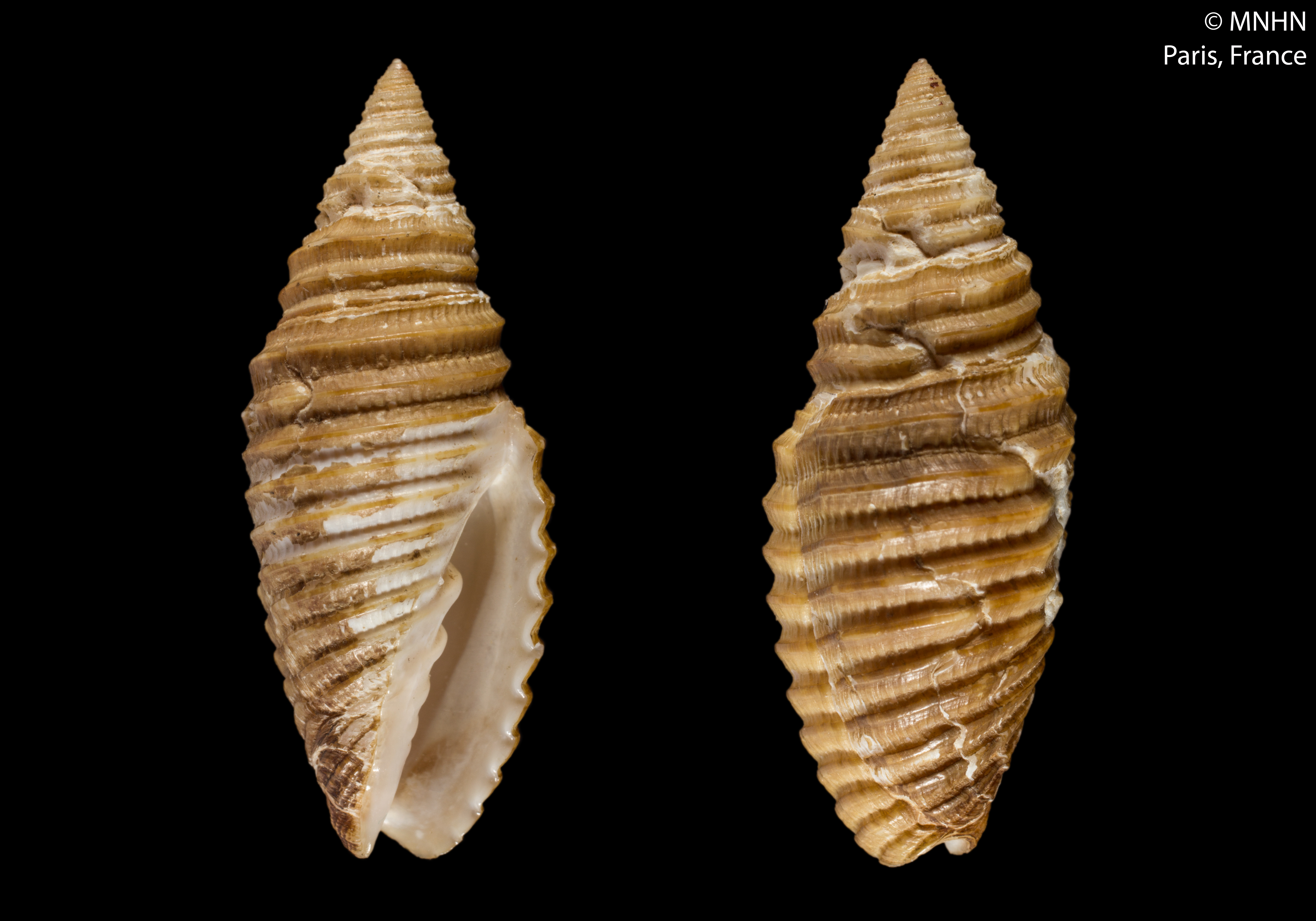
- Shell of Subcancilla malleti (syntype at MNHN, Paris)

Scientific classification
- Kingdom: Animalia
- Phylum: Mollusca
- Class: Gastropoda
- Subclass: Caenogastropoda
- Order: Neogastropoda
- Superfamily: Mitroidea
- Family: Mitridae
- Genus: Subcancilla
- Species: S. malleti

Binomial name
- Subcancilla malleti (Petit de la Saussaye, 1852)

Synonyms
- Mitra malleti Petit de la Saussaye, 1852

= Subcancilla malleti =

Species of gastropod

Subcancilla malleti is a species of sea snail, a marine gastropod mollusk, in the family Mitridae, the miters or miter snails.

== Description ==
The length of the shell attains 23.4 mm.
