= Isara aikeni =

Scientific classification
- Kingdom: Animalia
- Phylum: Mollusca
- Class: Gastropoda
- Subclass: Caenogastropoda
- Order: Neogastropoda
- Family: Mitridae
- Genus: Isara
- Species: I. aikeni

Binomial name
- Isara aikeni (Lussi, 2009)

Synonyms
- Mitra aikeni Lussi, 2009

Species of gastropod

Isara aikeni is a species of sea snail, a marine gastropod mollusk in the family Mitridae, the miters or miter snails.

== Description ==
Isara aikeni is a small marine gastropod with an elongated, fusiform shell typical of miter snails in the family Mitridae. The shell is smooth and slender, with a high spire and a narrow aperture. Its coloration is generally reddish to orange-brown, sometimes with lighter bands or subtle patterning along the whorls. The surface of the shell may show fine spiral lines and a glossy texture.

The species belongs to the genus Isara, whose members are characterized by narrow, tapering shells and well-defined whorls. Adult shells of I. aikeni are relatively small compared to other mitrid snails, typically measuring only a few centimeters in length. Like other members of its family, the animal itself has a soft body that remains mostly hidden within the shell, extending outward through the aperture when active.
