= Isara badia =

Scientific classification
- Kingdom: Animalia
- Phylum: Mollusca
- Class: Gastropoda
- Subclass: Caenogastropoda
- Order: Neogastropoda
- Superfamily: Mitroidea
- Family: Mitridae
- Subfamily: Isarinae
- Genus: Isara
- Species: I. badia

Binomial name
- Isara badia (Reeve, 1844)

Synonyms
- Mitra (Mitra) badia Reeve, 1844; Mitra badia Reeve, 1844

Species of gastropod

Isara badia is a species of sea snail, a marine gastropod mollusk, in the family Mitridae, the miters or miter snails.
