= Isara midwayensis =

Scientific classification
- Kingdom: Animalia
- Phylum: Mollusca
- Class: Gastropoda
- Subclass: Caenogastropoda
- Order: Neogastropoda
- Family: Mitridae
- Genus: Isara
- Species: I. midwayensis

Binomial name
- Isara midwayensis (Kosuge, 1979)

Synonyms
- Mitra midwayensis Kosuge, 1979

Species of gastropod

Isara midwayensis is a species of sea snail, a marine gastropod mollusk in the family Mitridae, the miters or miter snails.
