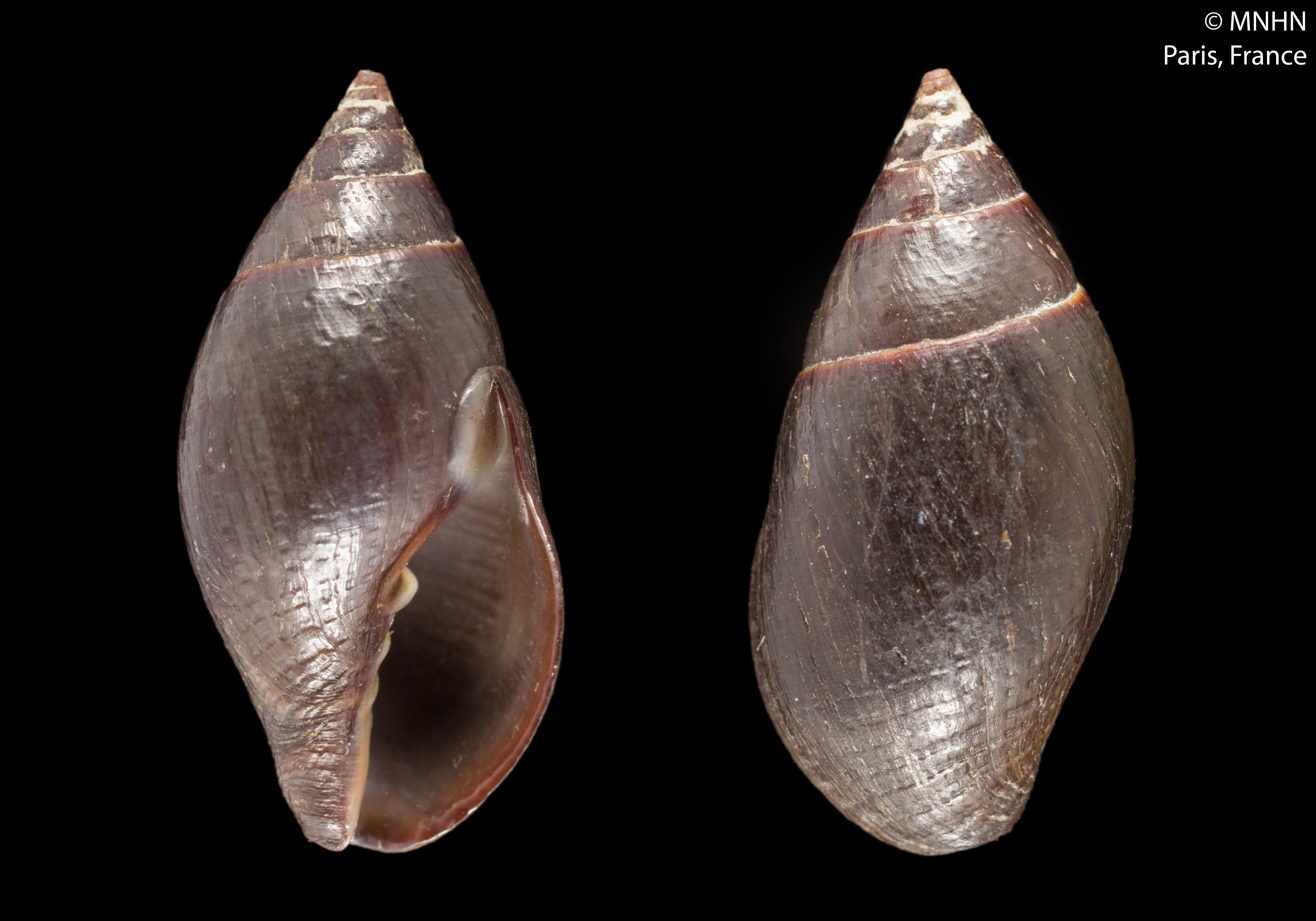
- Shell of Isara nigra (syntype at MNHN, Paris)

Scientific classification
- Kingdom: Animalia
- Phylum: Mollusca
- Class: Gastropoda
- Subclass: Caenogastropoda
- Order: Neogastropoda
- Superfamily: Mitroidea
- Family: Mitridae
- Subfamily: Isarinae
- Genus: Isara
- Species: I. nigra

Binomial name
- Isara nigra (Gmelin, 1791)

Synonyms
- Mitra nigra (Gmelin, 1791); Voluta nigra Gmelin, 1791

= Isara nigra =

Species of gastropod

Isara nigra is a species of sea snail, a marine gastropod mollusk, in the family Mitridae, the miters or miter snails.

== Description ==
The length of the shell attains 20 mm.

== Distribution ==
This marine species occurs off Papua New Guinea.
