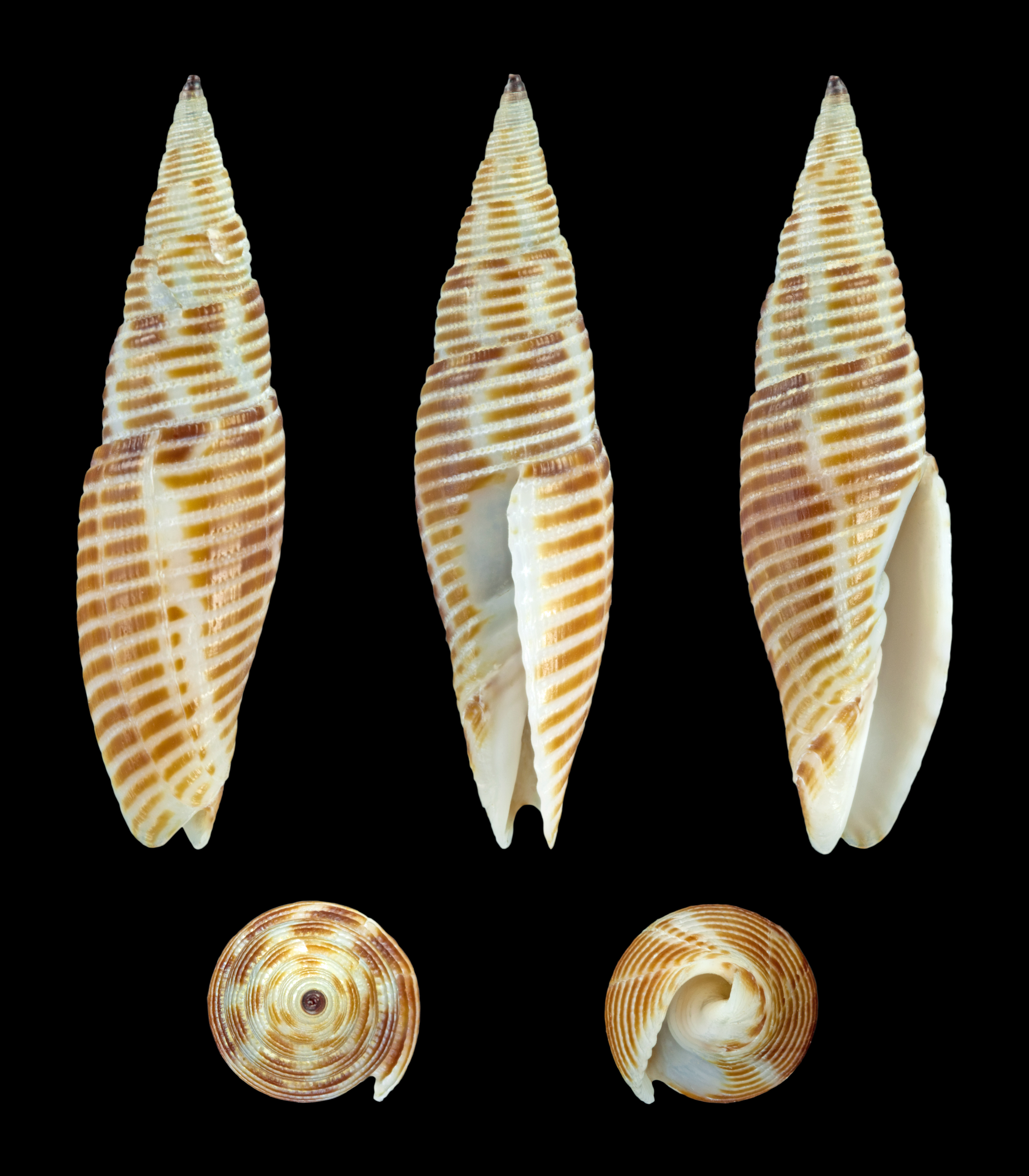

Scientific classification
- Kingdom: Animalia
- Phylum: Mollusca
- Class: Gastropoda
- Subclass: Caenogastropoda
- Order: Neogastropoda
- Family: Mitridae
- Genus: Cancilla
- Species: C. rehderi

Binomial name
- Cancilla rehderi (Webb, 1958)

Synonyms
- Mitra rehderi Webb, 1958; Ziba rehderi (Webb, 1958)

= Cancilla rehderi =

Species of mollusc

Cancilla rehderi is a species of sea snail, a marine gastropod mollusk in the family Mitridae, the miters or miter snails.
