= Subcancilla leonardhilli =

Scientific classification
- Kingdom: Animalia
- Phylum: Mollusca
- Class: Gastropoda
- Subclass: Caenogastropoda
- Order: Neogastropoda
- Superfamily: Mitroidea
- Family: Mitridae
- Genus: Subcancilla
- Species: S. leonardhilli

Binomial name
- Subcancilla leonardhilli Petuch, 1987

Species of gastropod

Subcancilla leonardhilli is a species of sea snail, a marine gastropod mollusk, in the family Mitridae, the miters or miter snails.

== Description ==
Original description: "Shell elongated, fusiform; body whorl with 12 large, raised, evenly-spaced cords; 1 fine spiral thread between each pair of cords; whorls rounded; spire whorls with 3 large cords; columella with 3 large plications; color pale yellow with wide, pale brown axial flammules; interior of aperture pale yellow-white."

== Distribution ==
Locus typicus: "Golfo de Triste, off Puerto Cabello, Venezuela."

This species occurs in Venezuela.
