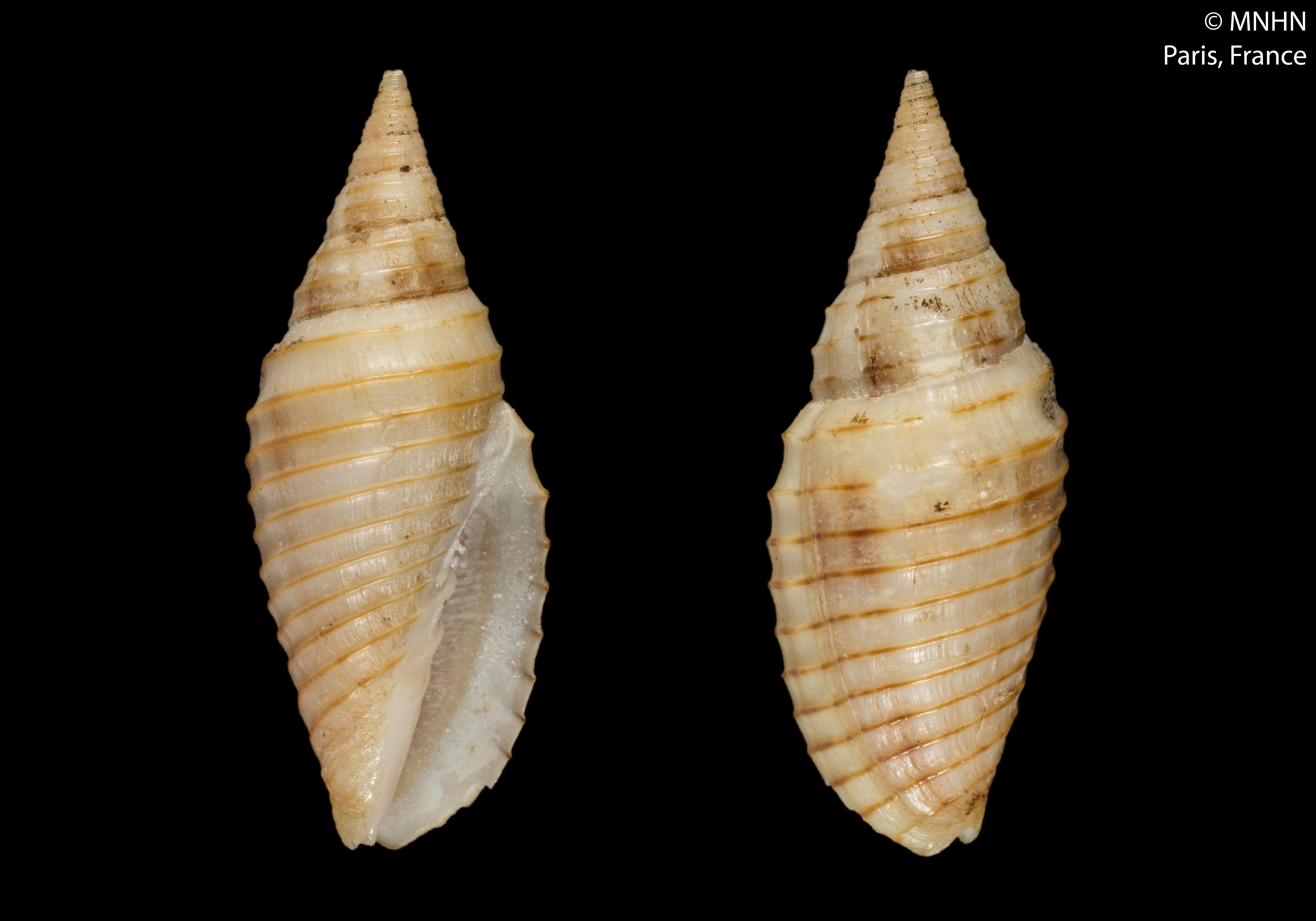
- Shell of Subcancilla haneti (syntype at MNHN, Paris)

Scientific classification
- Kingdom: Animalia
- Phylum: Mollusca
- Class: Gastropoda
- Subclass: Caenogastropoda
- Order: Neogastropoda
- Superfamily: Mitroidea
- Family: Mitridae
- Genus: Subcancilla
- Species: S. haneti

Binomial name
- Subcancilla haneti (Petit de la Saussaye, 1852)

Synonyms
- Mitra haneti Petit de la Saussaye, 1852

= Subcancilla haneti =

Species of gastropod

Subcancilla haneti is a species of sea snail, a marine gastropod mollusk, in the family Mitridae, the miters or miter snails.

== Description ==
The length of the shell attains 23.4 mm.

== Distribution ==
The species occurs off Mazatlan, Mexico.
