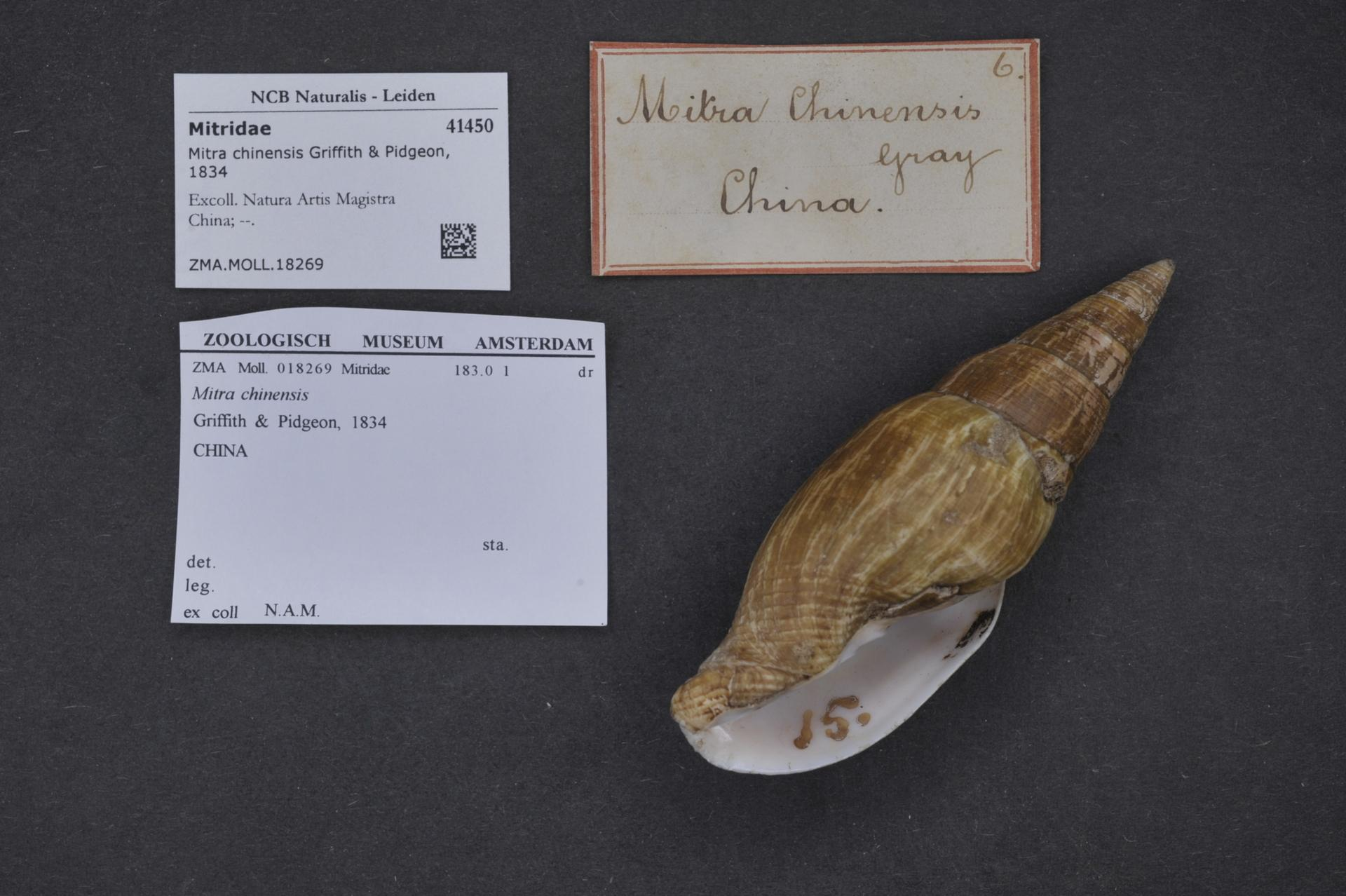

Scientific classification
- Kingdom: Animalia
- Phylum: Mollusca
- Class: Gastropoda
- Subclass: Caenogastropoda
- Order: Neogastropoda
- Family: Mitridae
- Genus: Isara
- Species: I. chinensis

Binomial name
- Isara chinensis (Gray, 1834)

Synonyms
- Mitra chinensis Gray, 1834

= Isara chinensis =

Species of gastropod

Isara chinensis is a species of sea snail, a marine gastropod mollusk in the family Mitridae, the miters or miter snails.==References==
