= Cancilla baeri =

Scientific classification
- Kingdom: Animalia
- Phylum: Mollusca
- Class: Gastropoda
- Subclass: Caenogastropoda
- Order: Neogastropoda
- Family: Mitridae
- Genus: Cancilla
- Species: C. baeri

Binomial name
- Cancilla baeri (Turner & Cernohorsky, 2003)

Synonyms
- Neocancilla baeri Turner & Cernohorsky, 2003

Species of gastropod

Cancilla baeri is a species of sea snail, a marine gastropod mollusk in the family Mitridae, the miters or miter snails.
