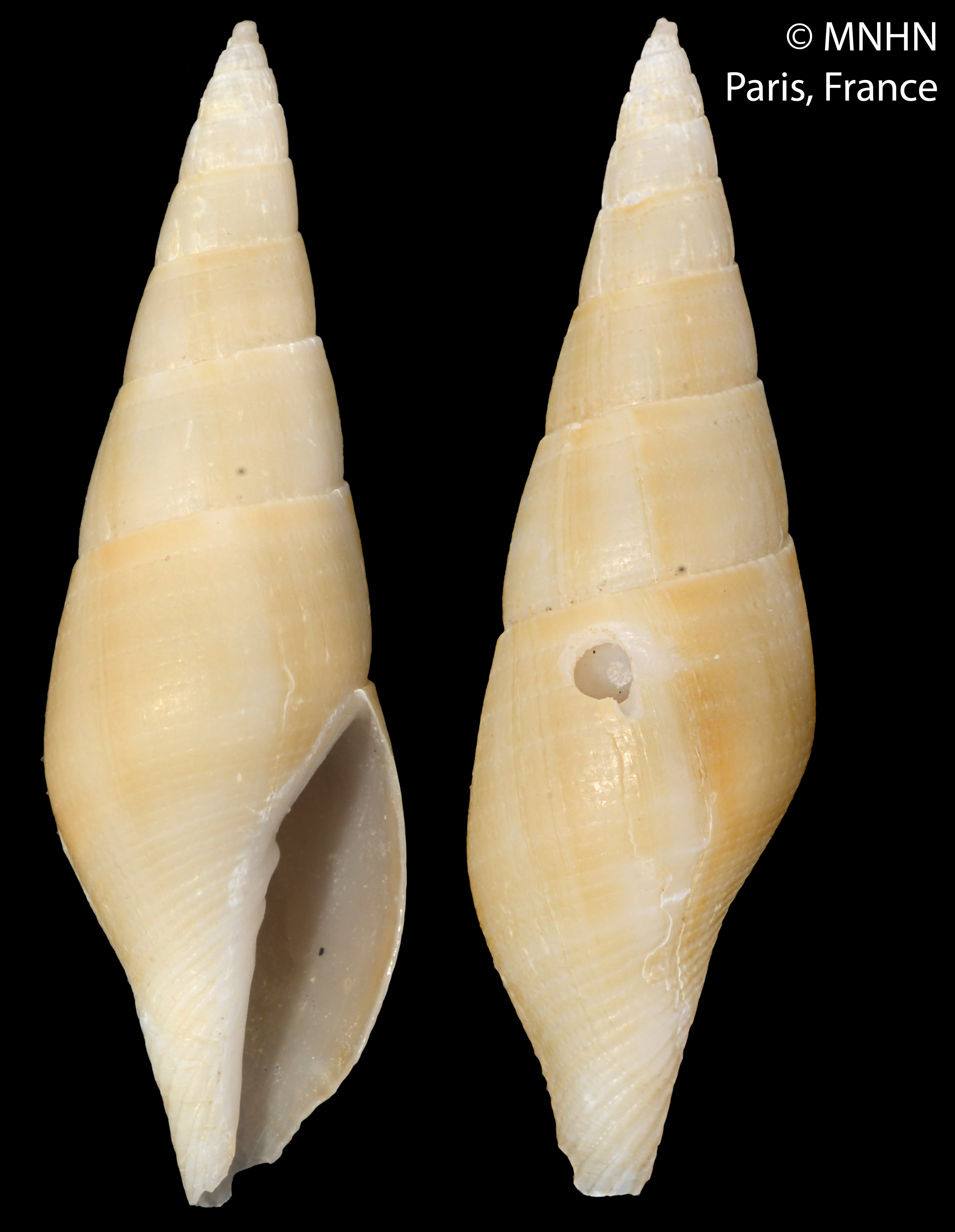

Scientific classification
- Kingdom: Animalia
- Phylum: Mollusca
- Class: Gastropoda
- Subclass: Caenogastropoda
- Order: Neogastropoda
- Superfamily: Mitroidea
- Family: Mitridae
- Subfamily: Mitrinae
- Genus: Profundimitra
- Species: P. taylori

Binomial name
- Profundimitra taylori Fedosov, Herrmann, Kantor & Bouchet, 2018

= Profundimitra taylori =

Species of gastropod

Profundimitra taylori is a species of sea snail, a marine gastropod mollusk, in the family Mitridae, the miters or miter snails.

== Description ==
The length of the shell attains 24.15 mm.

== Distribution ==
This marine species occurs off Papua New Guinea.
