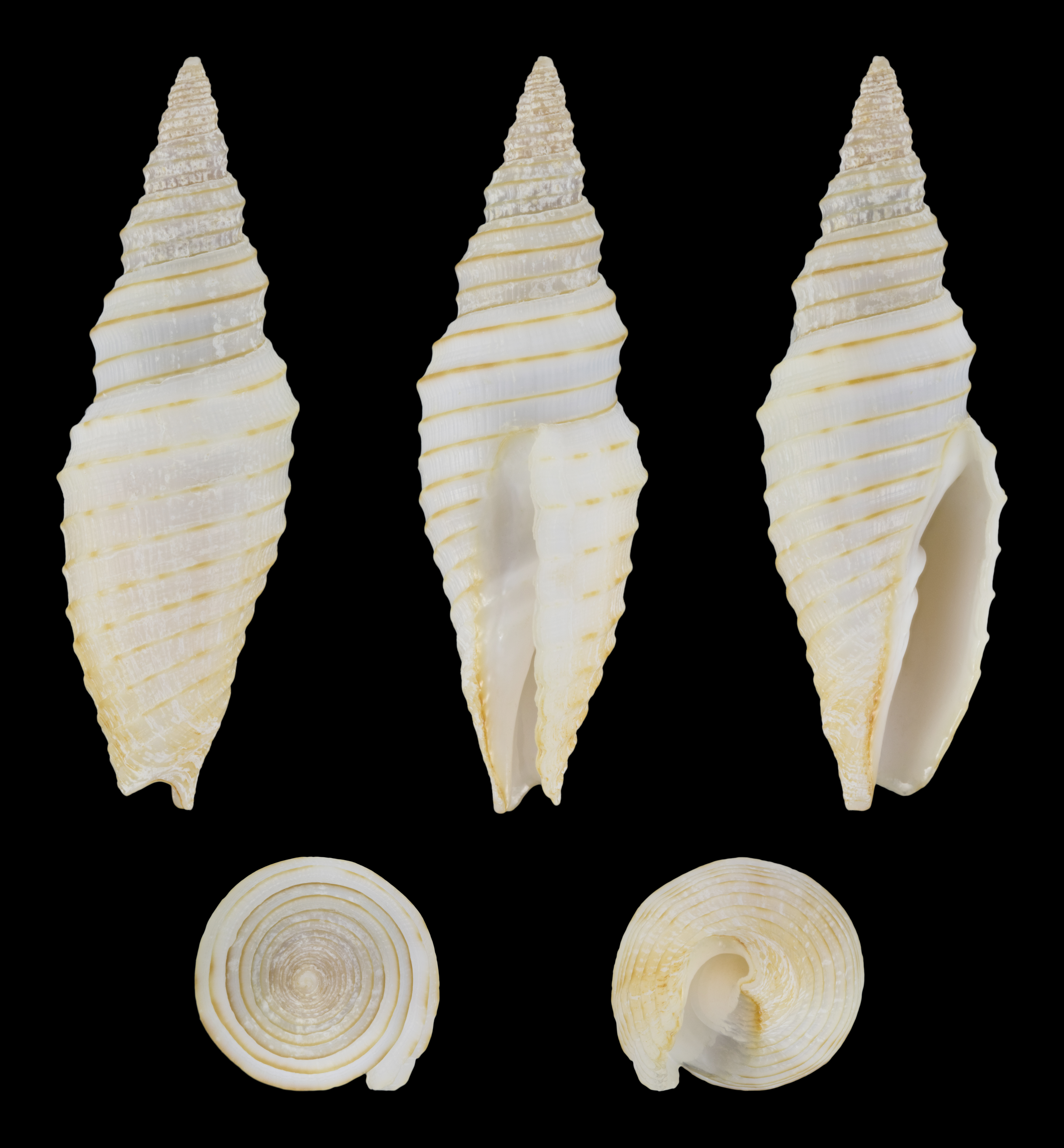

Scientific classification
- Kingdom: Animalia
- Phylum: Mollusca
- Class: Gastropoda
- Subclass: Caenogastropoda
- Order: Neogastropoda
- Superfamily: Mitroidea
- Family: Mitridae
- Genus: Subcancilla
- Species: S. hindsii

Binomial name
- Subcancilla hindsii (Reeve, 1844)

Synonyms
- Mitra hindsii Reeve, 1844

= Subcancilla hindsii =

Species of gastropod

Subcancilla hindsii is a species of sea snail, a marine gastropod mollusk, in the family Mitridae, the miters or miter snails.
