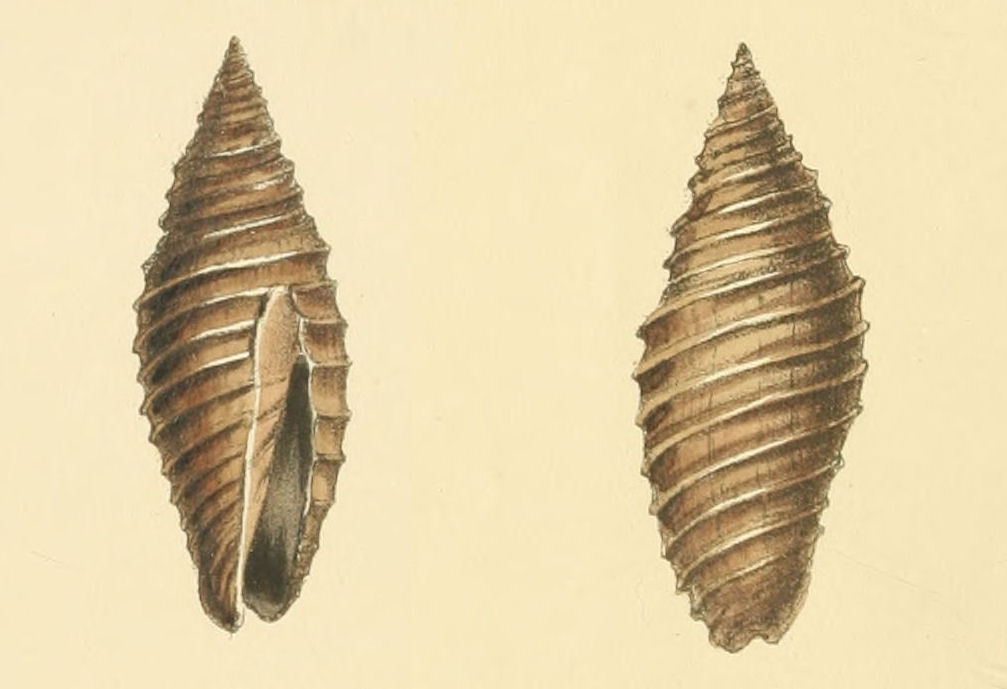

Scientific classification
- Kingdom: Animalia
- Phylum: Mollusca
- Class: Gastropoda
- Subclass: Caenogastropoda
- Order: Neogastropoda
- Family: Mitridae
- Genus: Subcancilla
- Species: S. sulcata

Binomial name
- Subcancilla sulcata (Swainson in Sowerby, 1825)

= Subcancilla sulcata =

Species of gastropod

Subcancilla sulcata is a species of sea snail, a marine gastropod mollusc in the family Mitridae, the miters or miter snails.

== Description ==
The species was first described by William Swainson as Mitra sulcata. The shell is marked by very distinct ridges aligned with the whorls.

== Distribution ==
The type specimen was obtained from the Pacific coast of the American Isthmus.
