= Isara cookii =

Scientific classification
- Kingdom: Animalia
- Phylum: Mollusca
- Class: Gastropoda
- Subclass: Caenogastropoda
- Order: Neogastropoda
- Family: Mitridae
- Genus: Isara
- Species: I. cookii

Binomial name
- Isara cookii (Sowerby, 1874)

Synonyms
- Mitra cookii Sowerby, 1874

Species of gastropod

Mitra cookii is a species of sea snail, a marine gastropod mollusk in the family Mitridae, the miters or miter snails.
