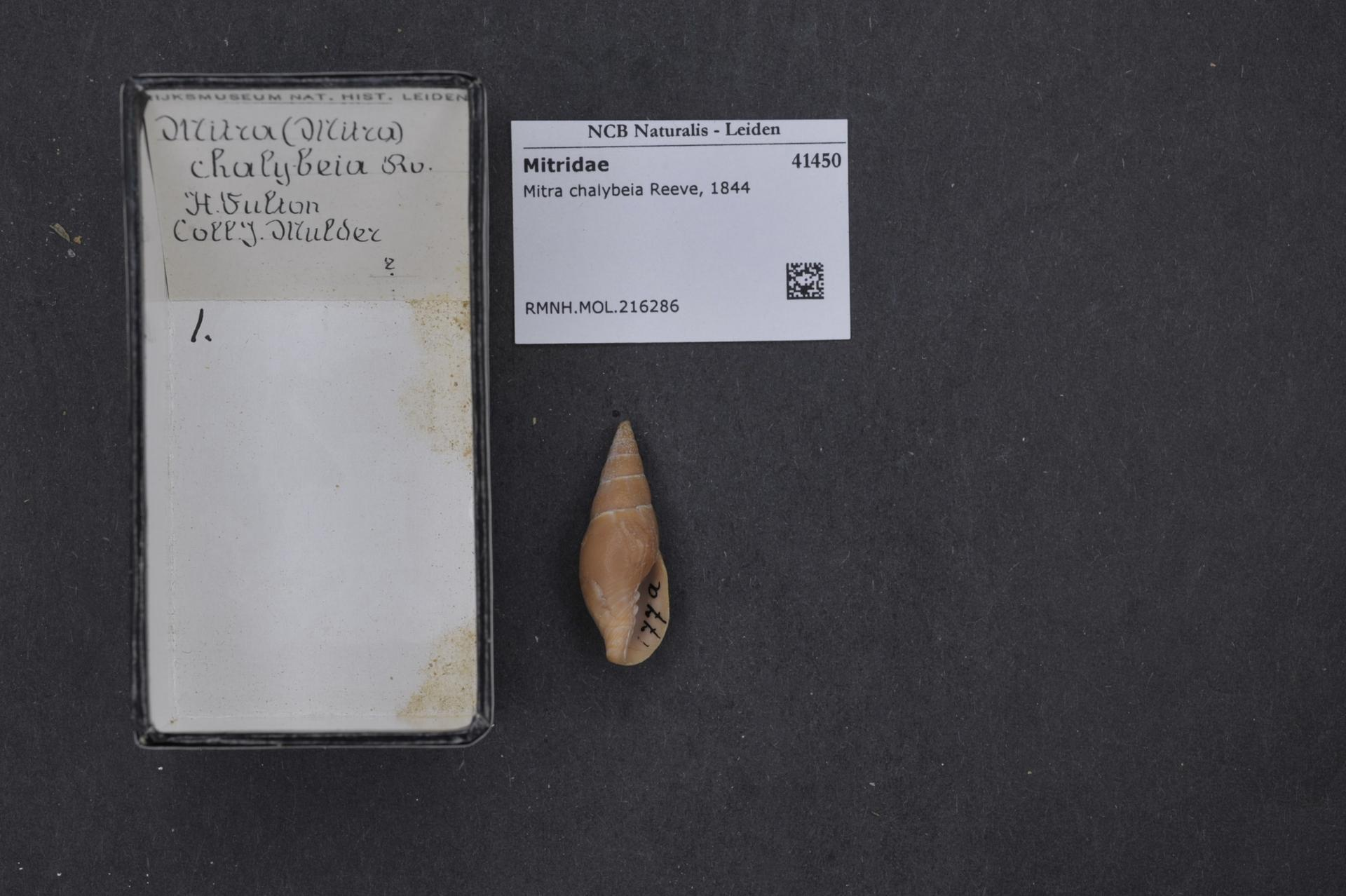
- Preserved specimen - Mitra chalybeia(Isara charlybeia) Reeve, 1844

Scientific classification
- Kingdom: Animalia
- Phylum: Mollusca
- Class: Gastropoda
- Subclass: Caenogastropoda
- Order: Neogastropoda
- Family: Mitridae
- Genus: Isara
- Species: I. chalybeia

Binomial name
- Isara chalybeia (Reeve, 1844)

Synonyms
- Mitra chalybeia Reeve, 1844

= Isara chalybeia =

Species of gastropod

Isara chalybeia is a species of sea snail, a marine gastropod mollusk in the family Mitridae, the miters or miter snails.

== Description ==
Shell size 40 mm.

== Distribution ==
Australia.
