= Isara turtoni =

Scientific classification
- Kingdom: Animalia
- Phylum: Mollusca
- Class: Gastropoda
- Subclass: Caenogastropoda
- Order: Neogastropoda
- Superfamily: Mitroidea
- Family: Mitridae
- Subfamily: Isarinae
- Genus: Isara
- Species: I. turtoni

Binomial name
- Isara turtoni (E. A. Smith, 1890)

Synonyms
- Cancilla turtoni (E. A. Smith, 1890); Mitra (Cancilla) turtoni E. A. Smith, 1890; Mitra turtoni E. A. Smith, 1890

Species of gastropod

Isara turtoni is a species of sea snail, a marine gastropod mollusk, in the family Mitridae, the miters or miter snails.
