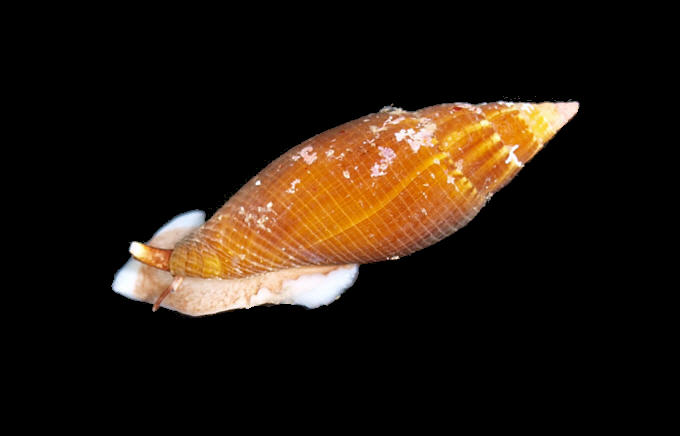
- Shell with periostracum and animal of Isara gabonensis

Scientific classification
- Kingdom: Animalia
- Phylum: Mollusca
- Class: Gastropoda
- Subclass: Caenogastropoda
- Order: Neogastropoda
- Family: Mitridae
- Genus: Isara
- Species: I. gabonensis

Binomial name
- Isara gabonensis (Biraghi, 1984)

Synonyms
- Mitra gabonensis Biraghi, 1984

= Isara gabonensis =

Species of gastropod

Isara gabonensis is a species of sea snail, a marine gastropod mollusk in the family Mitridae, the miters or miter snails.

== Description ==
Original description: The shell is fusiformly elongated, quite solid. It has six whorls, apart from the protoconch, only slightly convex and decreasingly spirally corded. The cords become faint striae on the body whorl, where they are crossed by equally faint growth marks. The aperture is three-fifths of total height, moderately narrow. The outer lip is simple, not very thickened. The columella is moderately calloused, with five folds of which the adapical one is strong and the abapical barely visible. The siphonal canal is short, straight and obliquely ribbed on the dorsal side. The siphonal notch is shallow. The apex is milky white, the first whorls are tan with white longitudinal flecks, thebody whorl is white with tan marks under the suture, which is distinct, but not canaliculate.

The holotype is 31 mm high and 10.5 mm wide. It is deposited in the Museum National d'Histoire Naturelle (MNHN) of Paris.

== Distribution ==
This species occurs in the Atlantic Ocean off the West African coast. It is not common and occurs only below 8 meters from Senegal to Angola on mixed rock and sand bottoms. It has been found in Senegal (A. Trencart), Ghana (P. Ryall, Pers. Comm.), Gabon (type locality), São Tomé and Príncipe (S. Gori, Pers. Comm.) and Angola (P. Ryall, Pers. Comm.).
