= Subcancilla attenuata =

Scientific classification
- Kingdom: Animalia
- Phylum: Mollusca
- Class: Gastropoda
- Subclass: Caenogastropoda
- Order: Neogastropoda
- Family: Mitridae
- Genus: Subcancilla
- Species: S. attenuata

Binomial name
- Subcancilla attenuata (Broderip, 1836)

Synonyms
- Tiara attenuata Broderip, 1836 (original combination); Ziba attenuata (Broderip, 1836)

Species of gastropod

Subcancilla attenuata is a species of sea snail, a marine gastropod mollusk in the family Mitridae, the miters or miter snails.
