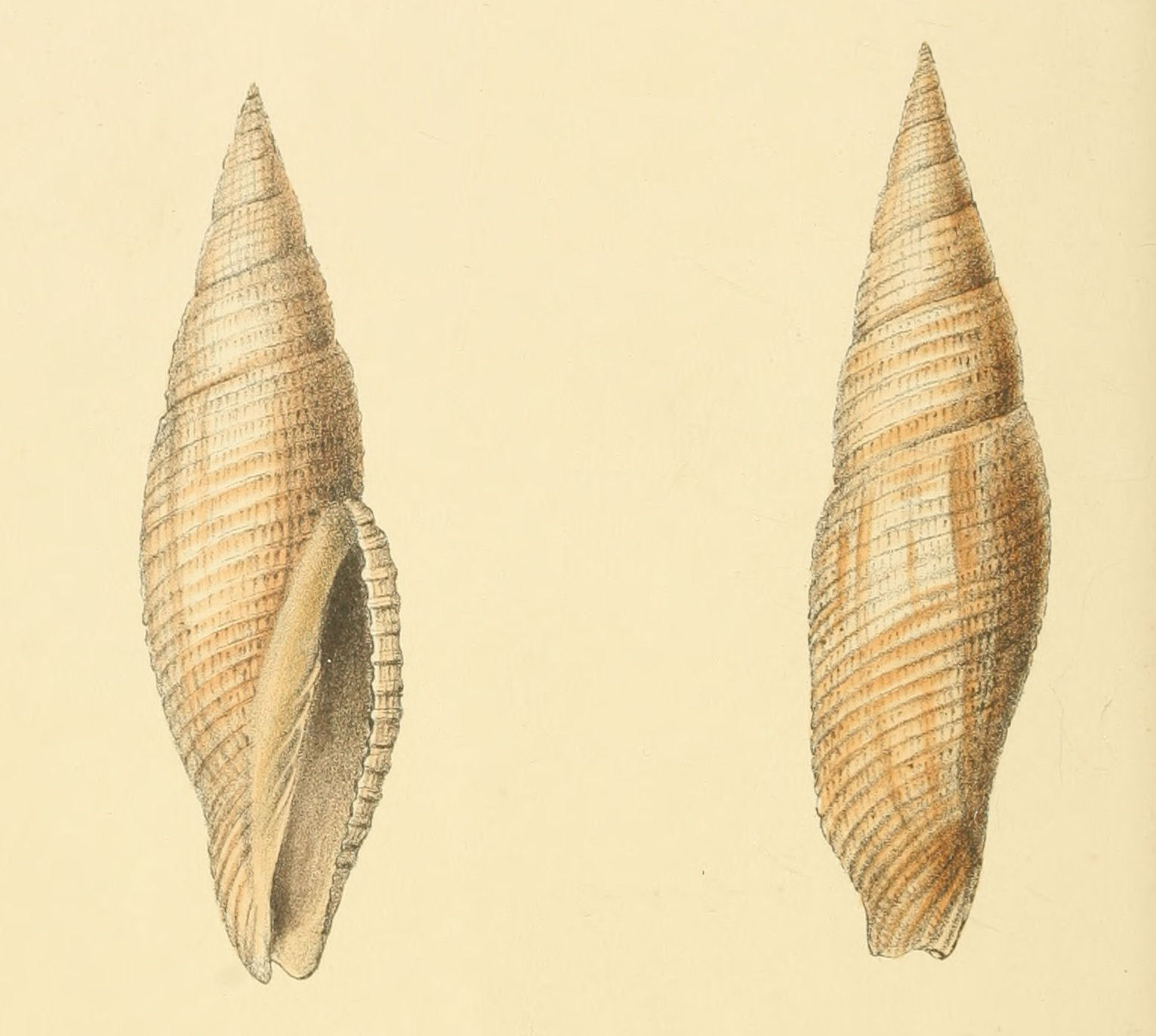

Scientific classification
- Kingdom: Animalia
- Phylum: Mollusca
- Class: Gastropoda
- Subclass: Caenogastropoda
- Order: Neogastropoda
- Family: Mitridae
- Genus: Cancilla
- Species: C. isabella

Binomial name
- Cancilla isabella (Swainson, 1831)

Synonyms
- Tiara isabella Swainson, 1831; Mitra morchii Adams, 1855; Mitra herklotsiana Dohrn, 1861; Mitra (Scabricola) yokoyamai Nomura, 1935; Tiara acuminata Shuto, 1969

= Cancilla isabella =

Species of gastropod

Cancilla isabella is a species of sea snail, a marine gastropod mollusk in the family Mitridae, the miters or miter snails.

== Description ==
The species was first described by William Swainson as Tiara isabella. The shell is slender, fawn coloured, unspotted, and marked by slender crowded, transverse, convex ribs with the interstices deeply cancellated.

== Distribution ==
The type specimen was obtained from "New Holland", i.e. Australia.
