= Isara ulala =

Scientific classification
- Kingdom: Animalia
- Phylum: Mollusca
- Class: Gastropoda
- Subclass: Caenogastropoda
- Order: Neogastropoda
- Superfamily: Mitroidea
- Family: Mitridae
- Subfamily: Isarinae
- Genus: Isara
- Species: I. ulala

Binomial name
- Isara ulala (Garcia, 2011)

Synonyms
- Mitra (Fusimitra) ulala Garcia, 2011; Mitra ulala Garcia, 2011

Species of gastropod

Isara ulala is a species of sea snail, a marine gastropod mollusk, in the family Mitridae, the miters or miter snails.
