= Subcancilla leonardi =

Scientific classification
- Kingdom: Animalia
- Phylum: Mollusca
- Class: Gastropoda
- Subclass: Caenogastropoda
- Order: Neogastropoda
- Superfamily: Mitroidea
- Family: Mitridae
- Genus: Subcancilla
- Species: S. leonardi

Binomial name
- Subcancilla leonardi (Petuch, 1990)

Synonyms
- Mitra (Nebularia) leonardi Petuch, 1990; Mitra leonardi Petuch, 1990

Species of gastropod

Subcancilla leonardi is a species of sea snail, a marine gastropod mollusk, in the family Mitridae, the miters or miter snails.
