= Isara joostei =

Scientific classification
- Kingdom: Animalia
- Phylum: Mollusca
- Class: Gastropoda
- Subclass: Caenogastropoda
- Order: Neogastropoda
- Family: Mitridae
- Genus: Isara
- Species: I. joostei

Binomial name
- Isara joostei (Lussi, 2009)

Synonyms
- Mitra joostei Lussi, 2009

Species of gastropod

Isara joostei is a species of sea snail, a marine gastropod mollusk in the family Mitridae, the miters or miter snails.
