= Subcancilla erythrogramma =

Scientific classification
- Kingdom: Animalia
- Phylum: Mollusca
- Class: Gastropoda
- Subclass: Caenogastropoda
- Order: Neogastropoda
- Family: Mitridae
- Genus: Subcancilla
- Species: S. erythrogramma

Binomial name
- Subcancilla erythrogramma (Tomlin, 1931)

Synonyms
- Mitra erythrogramma Tomlin, 1931 (original combination); Subcancilla welkerorum Whitney, 1977; Tiara lineata Broderip, 1836 (invalid: junior secondary homonym of Mitra lineata Schumacher, 1817; Mitra erythrogramma is a replacement name; Ziba erythrogramma (Tomlin, 1931); Ziba welkerorum Whitney, 1977

Species of gastropod

Subcancilla erythrogramma is a species of sea snail, a marine gastropod mollusk in the family Mitridae, the miters or miter snails.

== Distribution ==
This marine species occurs in the Pacific Ocean off Mexico.
