= Subcancilla lopesi =

Scientific classification
- Kingdom: Animalia
- Phylum: Mollusca
- Class: Gastropoda
- Subclass: Caenogastropoda
- Order: Neogastropoda
- Superfamily: Mitroidea
- Family: Mitridae
- Genus: Subcancilla
- Species: S. lopesi

Binomial name
- Subcancilla lopesi (Matthews & Coelho, 1969)

Synonyms
- Mitra (Cancilla) lopesi Matthews & Coelho, 1969; Mitra lopesi Matthews & Coelho, 1969

Species of gastropod

Subcancilla lopesi is a species of sea snail, a marine gastropod mollusk, in the family Mitridae, the miters or miter snails.
