= Subcancilla calodinota =

Scientific classification
- Kingdom: Animalia
- Phylum: Mollusca
- Class: Gastropoda
- Subclass: Caenogastropoda
- Order: Neogastropoda
- Family: Mitridae
- Genus: Subcancilla
- Species: S. calodinota

Binomial name
- Subcancilla calodinota (S.S. Berry, 1960)

Synonyms
- Ziba calodinota (S.S. Berry, 1960)

Species of gastropod

Subcancilla calodinota is a species of sea snail, a marine gastropod mollusk in the family Mitridae, the miters or miter snails.
