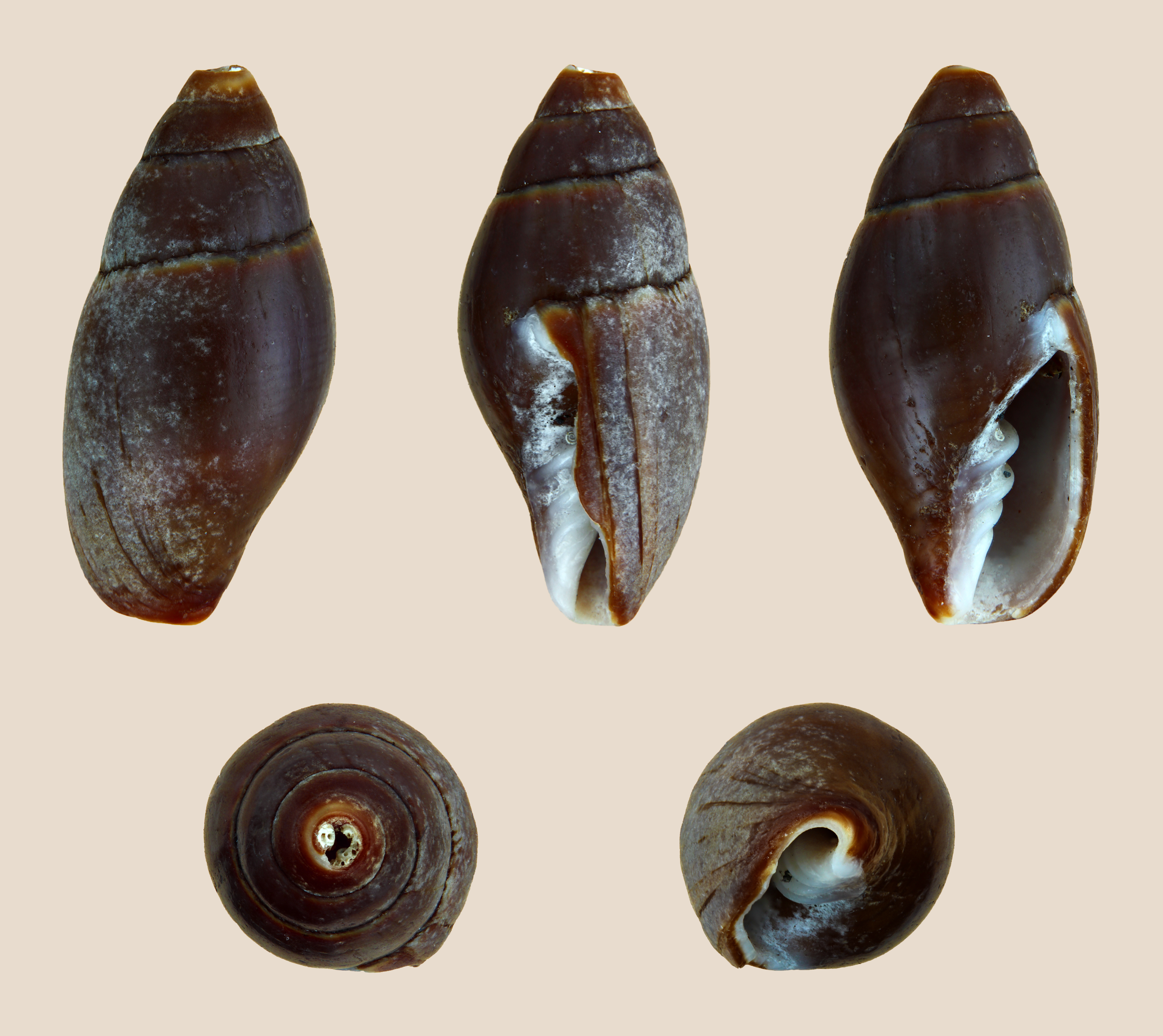

Scientific classification
- Kingdom: Animalia
- Phylum: Mollusca
- Class: Gastropoda
- Subclass: Caenogastropoda
- Order: Neogastropoda
- Family: Mitridae
- Genus: Isara
- Species: I. cornea

Binomial name
- Isara cornea (Lamarck, 1811)

Synonyms
- Mitra cornea Lamarck, 1811

= Isara cornea =

Species of gastropod

Isara cornea is a species of sea snail, a marine gastropod mollusk in the family Mitridae, the miters or miter snails.

== Description ==
Shell size 25-30 mm.
