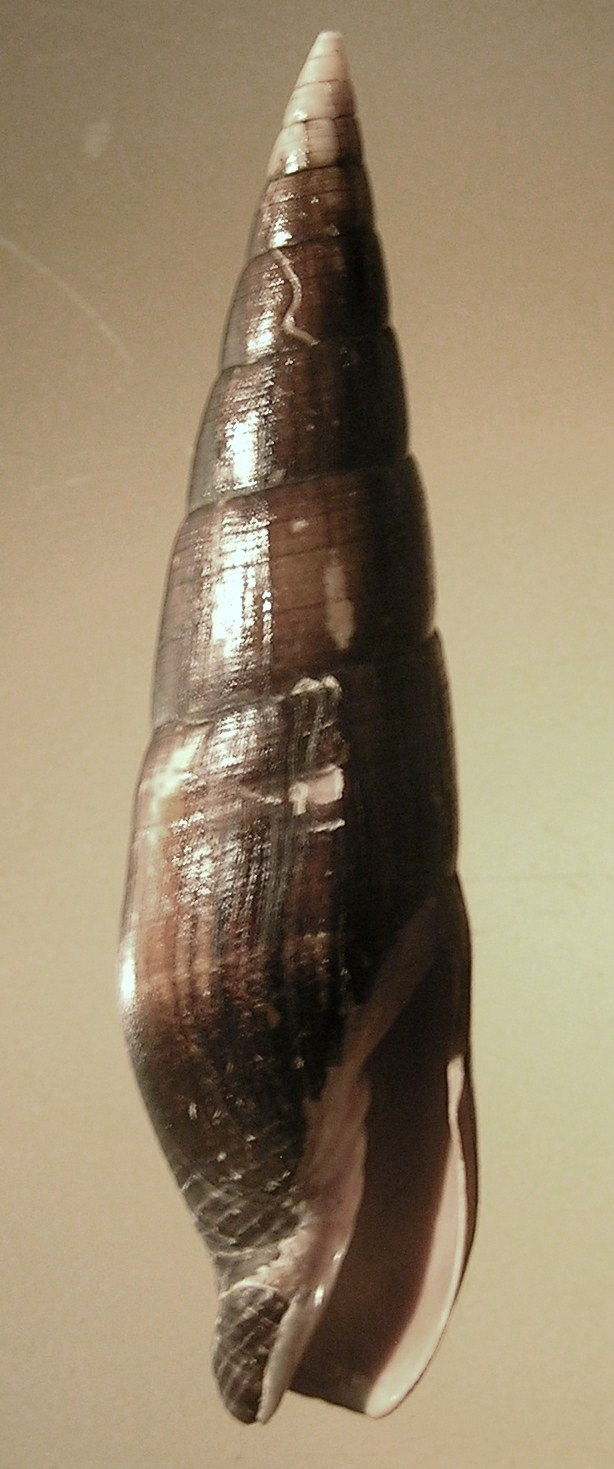

Scientific classification
- Kingdom: Animalia
- Phylum: Mollusca
- Class: Gastropoda
- Subclass: Caenogastropoda
- Order: Neogastropoda
- Family: Mitridae
- Genus: Isara
- Species: I. glabra

Binomial name
- Isara glabra (Swainson, 1821)

Synonyms
- Mitra glabra Swainson, 1821

= Isara glabra =

Species of gastropod

Isara glabra is a species of sea snail, a marine gastropod mollusk in the family Mitridae, the miters or miter snails.

== Distribution ==
Endemic to Australia, NSW to south WA.
