= Subcancilla gigantea =

Scientific classification
- Kingdom: Animalia
- Phylum: Mollusca
- Class: Gastropoda
- Subclass: Caenogastropoda
- Order: Neogastropoda
- Family: Mitridae
- Genus: Subcancilla
- Species: S. gigantea

Binomial name
- Subcancilla gigantea (Reeve, 1844)

Synonyms
- Ziba gigantea (Reeve, 1844)

Species of gastropod

Subcancilla gigantea is a species of sea snail, a marine gastropod mollusk in the family Mitridae, the miters or miter snails.

== Description ==
Subcancilla gigantea is one of the largest species in its family, reaching up to 18 cm in length. The shell is elongated, cylindrical, and slightly curved, with a pointed apex at one end and a wider aperture at the other end. Subcancilla gigantea is a carnivore that feeds on small invertebrates and other marine animals.

== Distribution ==
Subcancilla gigantea is found in the Indo-Pacific region, from the Red Sea to Japan, and is typically found on sandy or muddy bottoms in shallow waters.
