= Cancilla herrmanni =

Scientific classification
- Kingdom: Animalia
- Phylum: Mollusca
- Class: Gastropoda
- Subclass: Caenogastropoda
- Order: Neogastropoda
- Superfamily: Mitroidea
- Family: Mitridae
- Subfamily: Imbricariinae
- Genus: Cancilla
- Species: C. herrmanni

Binomial name
- Cancilla herrmanni Dekkers, 2014

Species of gastropod

Cancilla herrmanni is a species of sea snail, a marine gastropod mollusk, in the family Mitridae, the miters or miter snails.

== Distribution ==
This species occurs in Philippines.
