= Subcancilla edithrexae =

Scientific classification
- Kingdom: Animalia
- Phylum: Mollusca
- Class: Gastropoda
- Subclass: Caenogastropoda
- Order: Neogastropoda
- Family: Mitridae
- Genus: Subcancilla
- Species: S. edithrexae

Binomial name
- Subcancilla edithrexae Sphon, 1976

Synonyms
- Ziba edithrexae (Sphon, 1976)

Species of gastropod

Subcancilla edithrexae is a species of sea snail, a marine gastropod mollusk in the family Mitridae, the miters or miter snails.
