= Subcancilla funiculata =

Scientific classification
- Kingdom: Animalia
- Phylum: Mollusca
- Class: Gastropoda
- Subclass: Caenogastropoda
- Order: Neogastropoda
- Superfamily: Mitroidea
- Family: Mitridae
- Genus: Subcancilla
- Species: S. funiculata

Binomial name
- Subcancilla funiculata (Reeve, 1844)

Synonyms
- Mitra funiculata Reeve, 1844

Species of gastropod

Subcancilla funiculata is a species of sea snail, a marine gastropod mollusk, in the family Mitridae, the miters or miter snails.
