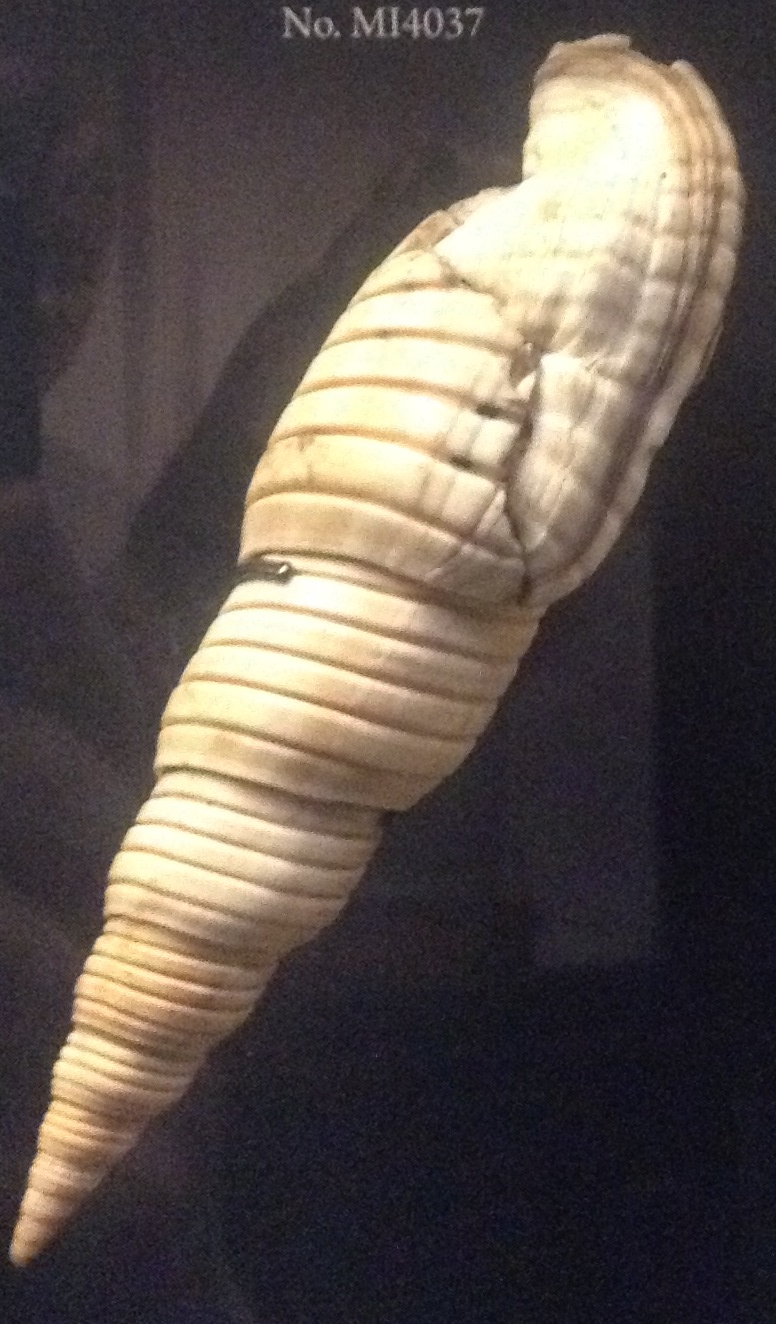

Scientific classification
- Kingdom: Animalia
- Phylum: Mollusca
- Class: Gastropoda
- Subclass: Caenogastropoda
- Order: Neogastropoda
- Family: Mitridae
- Genus: Subcancilla
- Species: S. belcheri

Binomial name
- Subcancilla belcheri (Hinds, 1844)

Synonyms
- Mitra belcheri Hinds, 1844

= Subcancilla belcheri =

Species of gastropod

Subcancilla belcheri is a species of sea snail, a marine gastropod mollusk in the family Mitridae, the miters or miter snails.
