= Isara slacksmithae =

Scientific classification
- Kingdom: Animalia
- Phylum: Mollusca
- Class: Gastropoda
- Subclass: Caenogastropoda
- Order: Neogastropoda
- Superfamily: Mitroidea
- Family: Mitridae
- Subfamily: Isarinae
- Genus: Isara
- Species: I. slacksmithae

Binomial name
- Isara slacksmithae (Marrow, 2013)

Synonyms
- Mitra (Mitra) slacksmithae Marrow, 2013; Mitra slacksmithae Marrow, 2013

Species of gastropod

Isara slacksmithae is a species of sea snail, a marine gastropod mollusk, in the family Mitridae, the miters or miter snails.
