= Isara antillensis =

Scientific classification
- Kingdom: Animalia
- Phylum: Mollusca
- Class: Gastropoda
- Subclass: Caenogastropoda
- Order: Neogastropoda
- Family: Mitridae
- Genus: Isara
- Species: I. antillensis

Binomial name
- Isara antillensis (Dall, 1889)

Synonyms
- Mitra antillensis Dall, 1889

Species of gastropod

Isara antillensis is a species of sea snail, a marine gastropod mollusk in the family Mitridae, the miters or miter snails.
