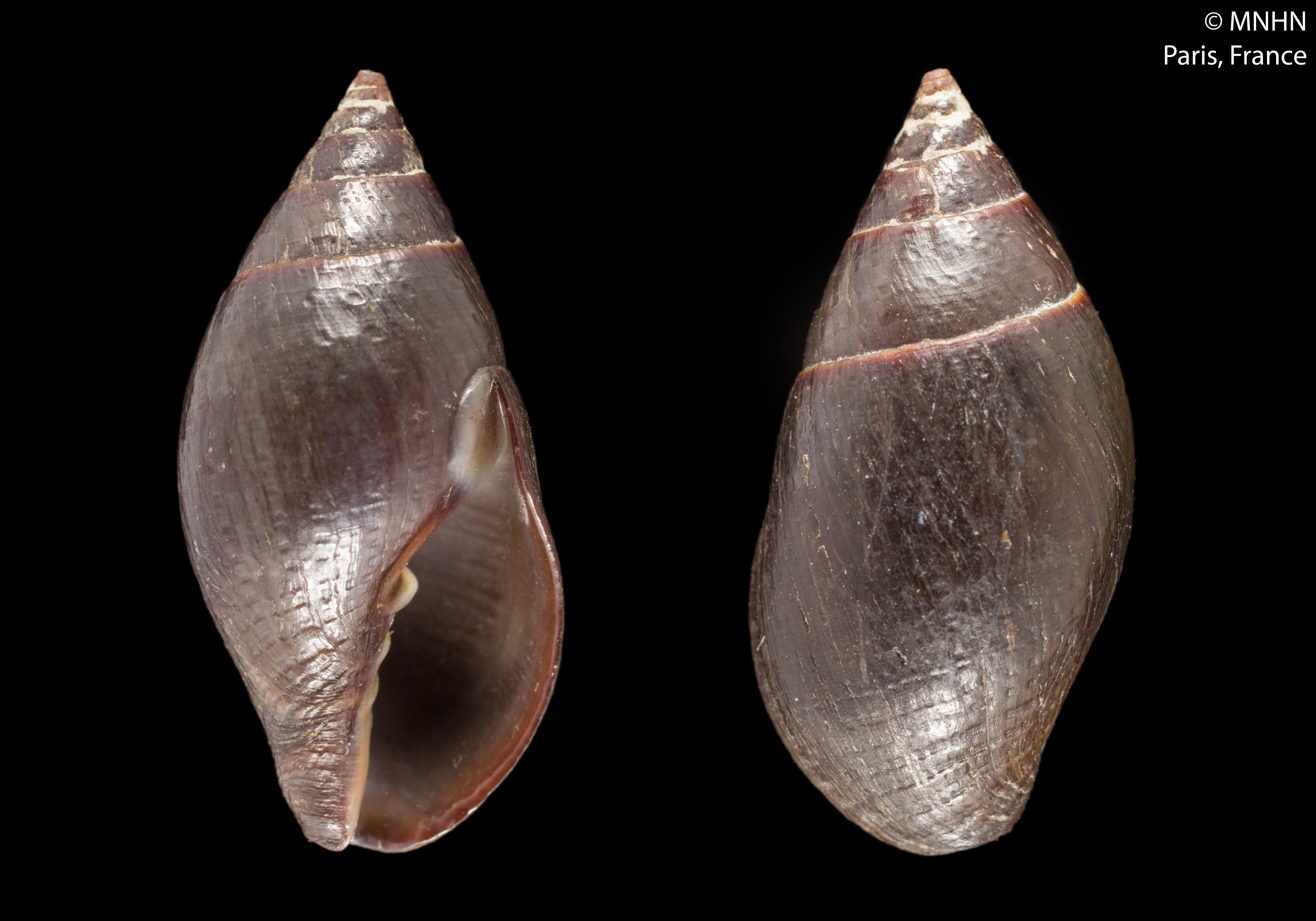
- Shell of Isara nigra (syntype at MNHN, Paris)

Scientific classification
- Kingdom: Animalia
- Phylum: Mollusca
- Class: Gastropoda
- Subclass: Caenogastropoda
- Order: Neogastropoda
- Superfamily: Mitroidea
- Family: Mitridae
- Subfamily: Isarinae
- Genus: Isara; H. Adams & A. Adams, 1853

Type species
- Mitra bulimoides Reeve, 1844

Species
- See text

Synonyms
- Mitra (Fuscomitra) Pallary, 1900; Mitra (Isara) H. Adams & A. Adams, 1853

= Isara (gastropod) =

Genus of gastropods

Isara is a genus of sea snails, marine gastropod mollusks in the family Mitridae.

== Species ==
Species within the genus Isara include:

- Isara aerumnosa (Melvill, 1888)
- Isara aikeni (Lussi, 2009)
- Isara antillensis (Dall, 1889)
- Isara badia (Reeve, 1844)
- Isara beui (Thach, 2016)
- Isara carbonaria (Swainson, 1822)
- Isara chalybeia (Reeve, 1844)
- Isara chinensis (Gray, 1834)
- Isara cookii (G. B. Sowerby II, 1874)
- Isara cornea (Lamarck, 1811)
- Isara declivis (Reeve, 1844)
- Isara gabonensis (Biraghi, 1984)
- Isara glabra (Swainson, 1821)
- Isara goreensis (Melvill, 1925)
- Isara joostei (Lussi, 2009)
- Isara lenhilli (Petuch, 1988)
- Isara midwayensis (Kosuge, 1979)
- Isara nigra (Gmelin, 1791)
- Isara pele (Cernohorsky, 1970)
- Isara peterclarksoni (Marrow, 2013)
- Isara picta (Reeve, 1844)
- Isara slacksmithae (Marrow, 2013)
- Isara straminea (A. Adams, 1853)
- Isara swainsonii (Broderip, 1836)
- Isara turtoni (E. A. Smith, 1890)
- Isara ulala (Garcia, 2011)
