= Subcancilla directa =

Scientific classification
- Kingdom: Animalia
- Phylum: Mollusca
- Class: Gastropoda
- Subclass: Caenogastropoda
- Order: Neogastropoda
- Superfamily: Mitroidea
- Family: Mitridae
- Genus: Subcancilla
- Species: S. directa

Binomial name
- Subcancilla directa (S. S. Berry, 1960)

Synonyms
- Mitra (Tiara) directa S. S. Berry, 1960; Mitra directa S. S. Berry, 1960

Species of gastropod

Subcancilla directa is a species of sea snail, a marine gastropod mollusk, in the family Mitridae, the miters or miter snails.
