= Isara goreensis =

Mitra goreensis

Scientific classification
- Kingdom: Animalia
- Phylum: Mollusca
- Class: Gastropoda
- Subclass: Caenogastropoda
- Order: Neogastropoda
- Family: Mitridae
- Genus: Isara
- Species: I. goreensis

Binomial name
- Isara goreensis (Melvill, 1925)

Synonyms
- Mitra goreensis Melvill, 1925

Species of gastropod

Isara goreensis is a species of sea snail, a marine gastropod mollusk in the family Mitridae, the miters or miter snails.
