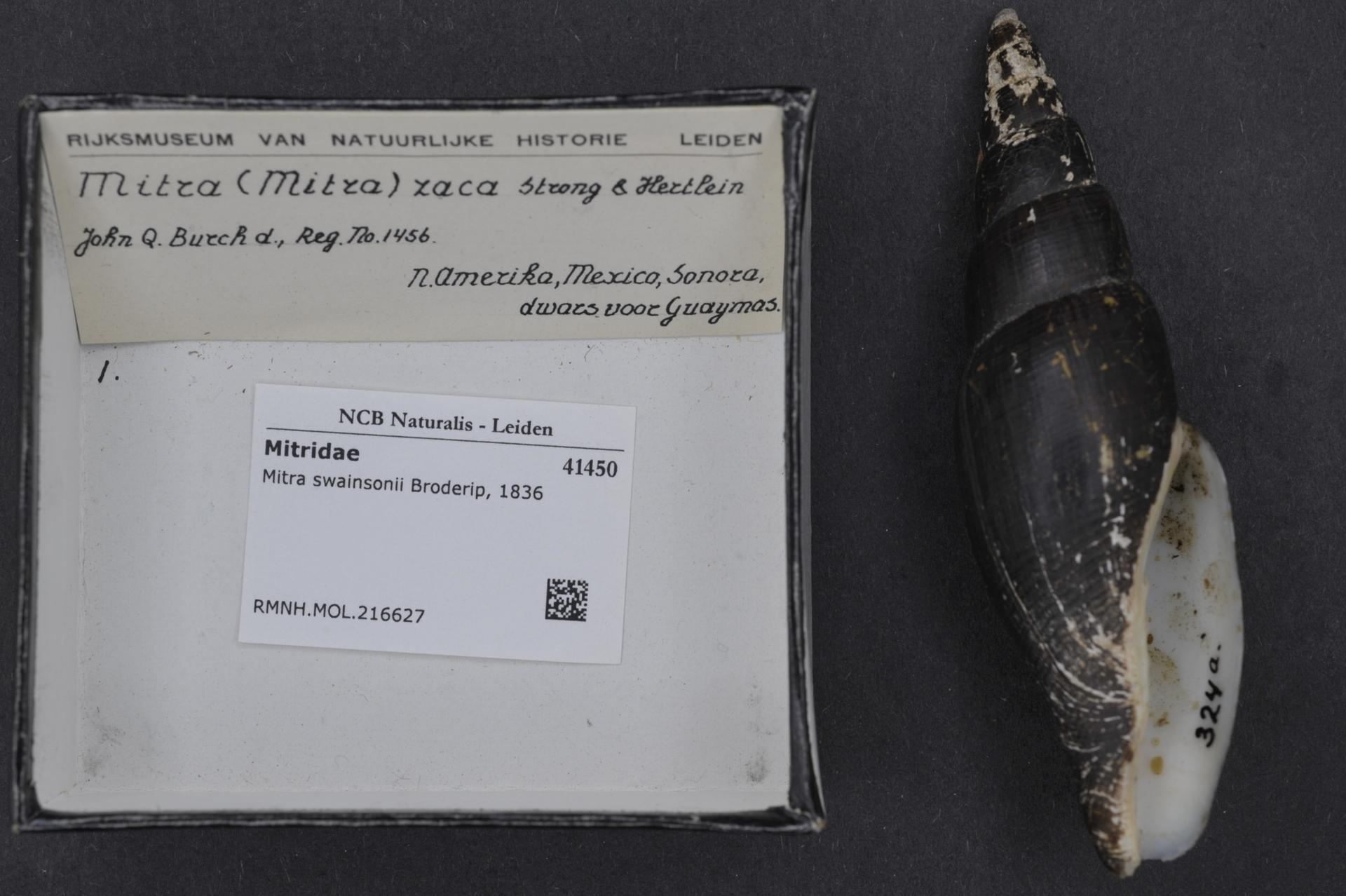
- Naturalis Biodiversity Center - RMNH.MOL.216627 - Mitra swainsonii Broderip, 1836 - Mitridae - Mollusc shell

Scientific classification
- Kingdom: Animalia
- Phylum: Mollusca
- Class: Gastropoda
- Subclass: Caenogastropoda
- Order: Neogastropoda
- Family: Mitridae
- Genus: Isara
- Species: I. swainsonii

Binomial name
- Isara swainsonii (Broderip, 1836)

Synonyms
- Mitra swainsonii Broderip, 1836

= Isara swainsonii =

Species of gastropod

Isara swainsonii is a species of sea snail, a marine gastropod mollusk in the family Mitridae, the miters or miter snails.
