= Cancilla heinickei =

Scientific classification
- Kingdom: Animalia
- Phylum: Mollusca
- Class: Gastropoda
- Subclass: Caenogastropoda
- Order: Neogastropoda
- Family: Mitridae
- Genus: Cancilla
- Species: C. heinickei

Binomial name
- Cancilla heinickei (Salisbury & Guillot de Suduiraut, 2003)

Synonyms
- Mitra heinickei Salisbury & Guillot de Suduiraut, 2003

Species of gastropod

Cancilla heinickei is a species of sea snail, a marine gastropod mollusk in the family Mitridae, the miters or miter snails.
