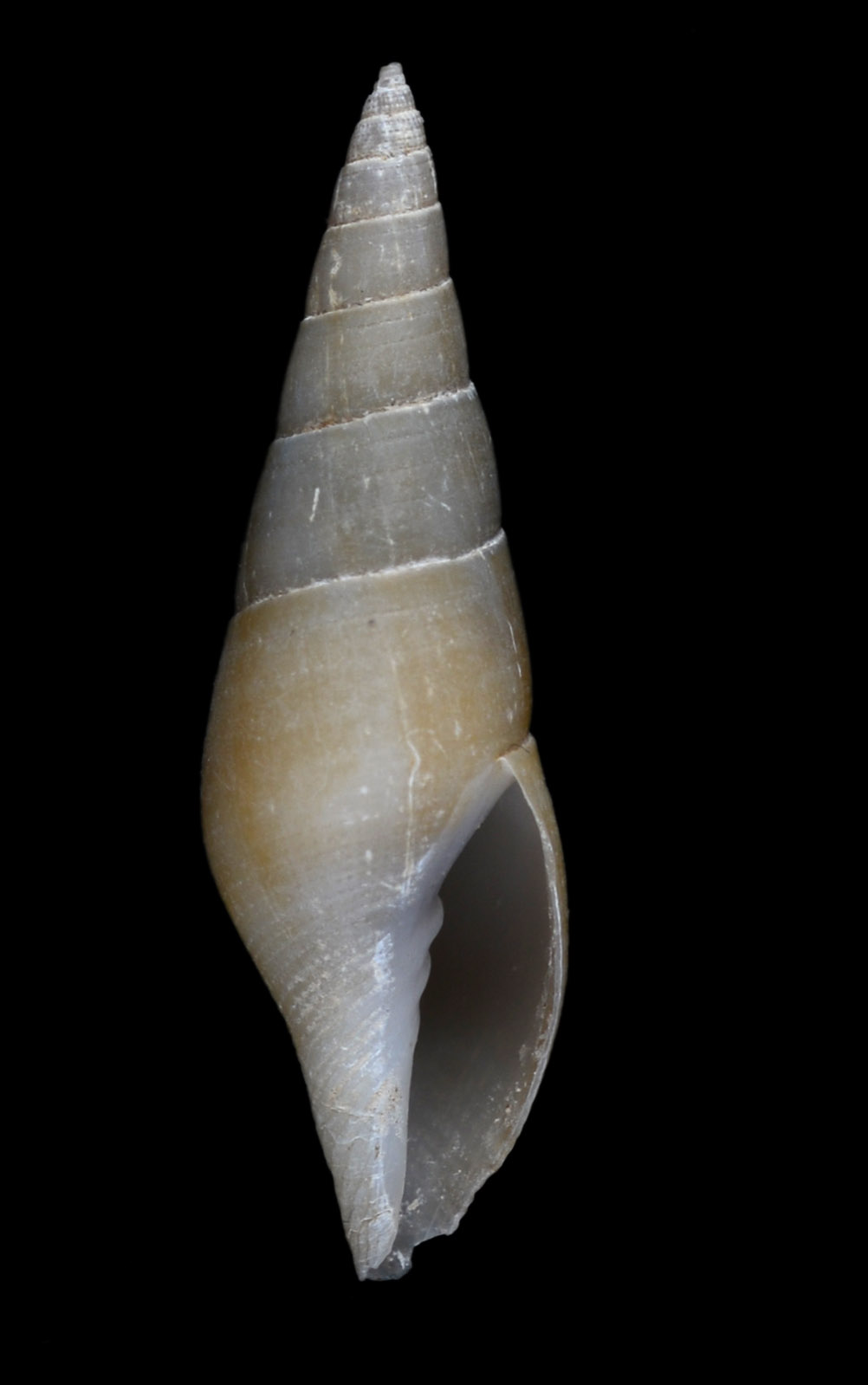
- Shell of Profundimitra taylori (holotype at MNHN, Paris)

Scientific classification
- Kingdom: Animalia
- Phylum: Mollusca
- Class: Gastropoda
- Subclass: Caenogastropoda
- Order: Neogastropoda
- Superfamily: Mitroidea
- Family: Mitridae
- Subfamily: Mitrinae
- Genus: Profundimitra; Fedosov, Herrmann, Kantor & Bouchet, 2018

Type species
- Profundimitra taylori Fedosov, Herrmann, Kantor & Bouchet, 2018

Species
- See text

= Profundimitra =

Genus of gastropods

Profundimitra is a genus of sea snails, marine gastropod mollusks in the subfamily Mitrinae of the family Mitridae.

== Species ==
Species within the genus Profundimitra include:

- Profundimitra abyssicola (Schepman, 1911)
- Profundimitra huichingae S.-I Huang, H.-Y. Kao & C.-W. Chu, 2025
- Profundimitra jenfucius S.-I Huang, H.-Y. Kao & C.-W. Chu, 2025
- Profundimitra kuoi S.-I Huang & Q.-Y. Chuo, 2019
- † Profundimitra lacuiensis S. N. Nielsen & Ampuero, 2020
- Profundimitra planofilum (S.-I Huang, 2011)
- Profundimitra taylori Fedosov, Herrmann, Kantor & Bouchet, 2018
