= Subcancilla lindae =

Scientific classification
- Kingdom: Animalia
- Phylum: Mollusca
- Class: Gastropoda
- Subclass: Caenogastropoda
- Order: Neogastropoda
- Superfamily: Mitroidea
- Family: Mitridae
- Genus: Subcancilla
- Species: S. lindae

Binomial name
- Subcancilla lindae Petuch, 1987

Species of gastropod

Subcancilla lindae is a species of sea snail, a marine gastropod mollusk, in the family Mitridae, the miters or miter snails.

== Description ==
Original description: "Shell very narrow, elongated, with high, elevated spire; body whorl with 16 large, rounded, evenly-spaced spiral cords; suture impressed, producing tabulate whorls and stepped spire; sides of body whorl straight; aperture narrow; columella with 3 plications; (shell) color pure white; interior of aperture pure white."

== Distribution ==
Locus typicus: "Golfo de Triste, off Puerto Cabello, Venezuela."

This species occurs in Venezuela.
