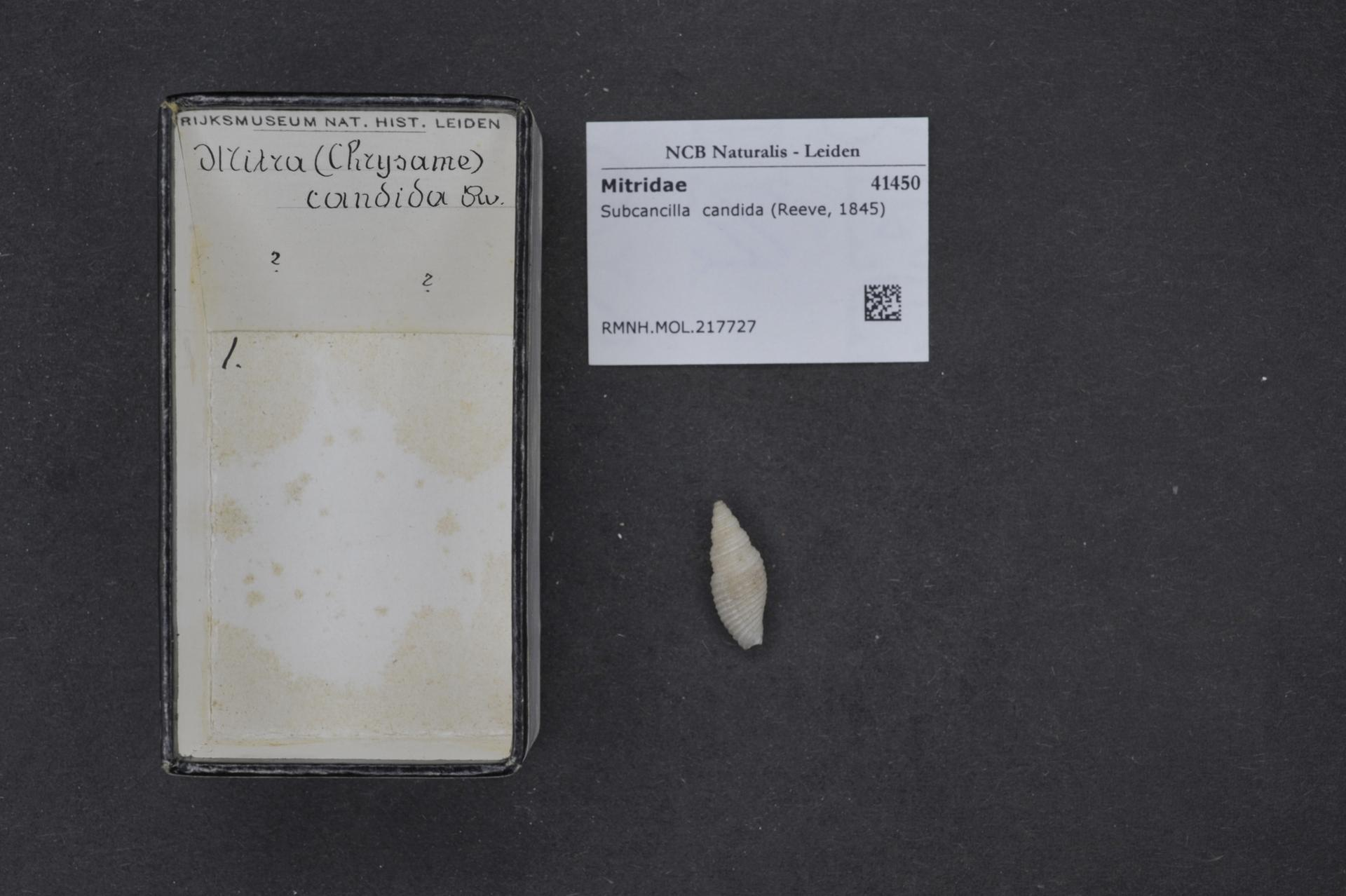

Scientific classification
- Kingdom: Animalia
- Phylum: Mollusca
- Class: Gastropoda
- Subclass: Caenogastropoda
- Order: Neogastropoda
- Family: Mitridae
- Genus: Subcancilla
- Species: S. candida

Binomial name
- Subcancilla candida (Reeve, 1845)

Synonyms
- Mitra candida Reeve, 1845; Ziba candida (Reeve, 1845)

= Subcancilla candida =

Species of gastropod

Subcancilla candida is a species of sea snail, a marine gastropod mollusc in the family Mitridae, the miters or miter snails.

== Description ==
The length of the shell varies between 10 mm and 30 mm.

== Distribution ==
This marine species occurs off Puerto Rico, the Virgin Islands, Venezuela and Panama
