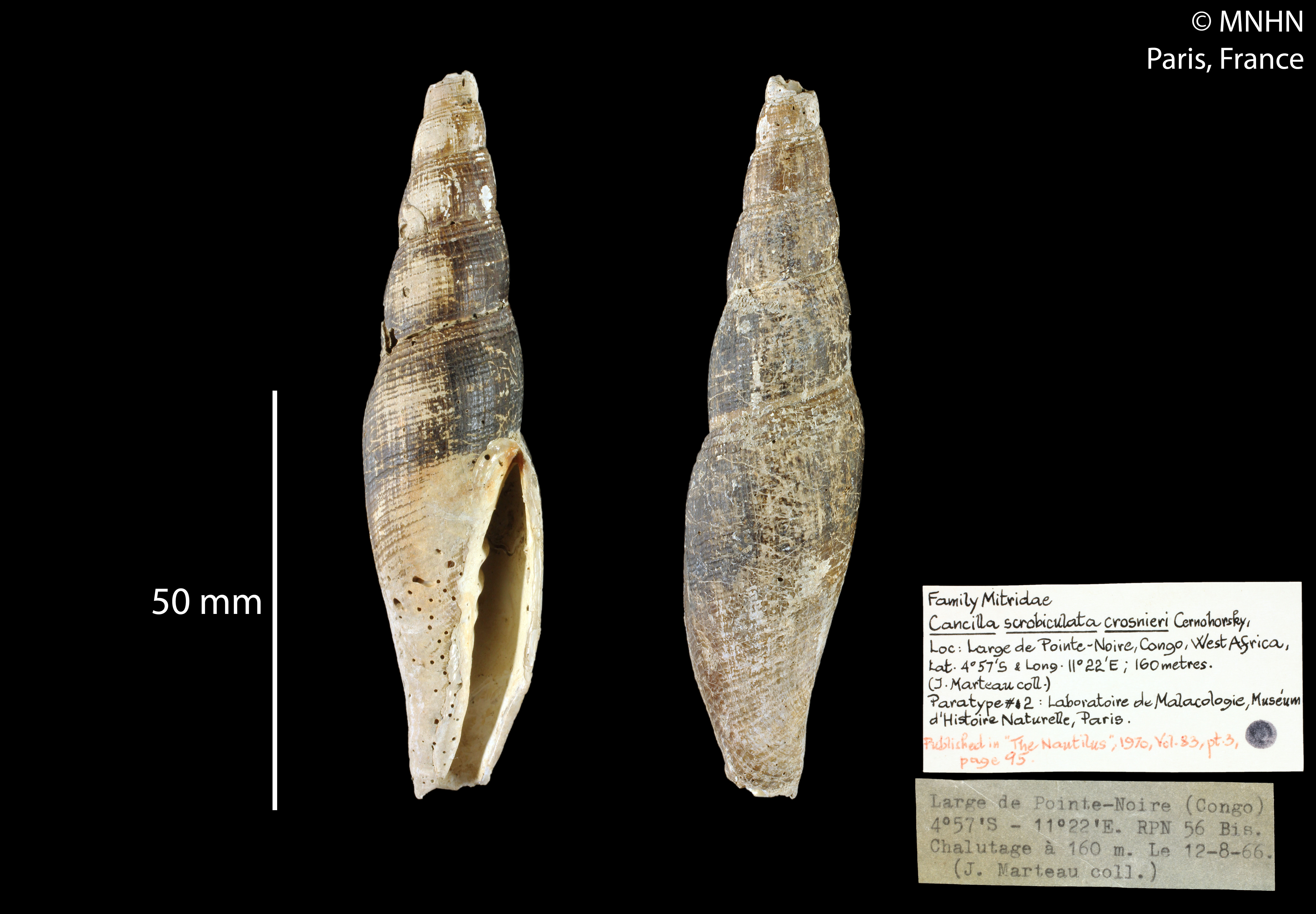
- Shell of Subcancilla scrobiculata crosnieri (paratype at MNHN, Paris)

Scientific classification
- Kingdom: Animalia
- Phylum: Mollusca
- Class: Gastropoda
- Subclass: Caenogastropoda
- Order: Neogastropoda
- Family: Mitridae
- Genus: Subcancilla
- Species: †S. scrobiculata

Binomial name
- †Subcancilla scrobiculata (Brocchi, 1814)

Synonyms
- Cancilla scrobiculata (Brocchi, 1814); Voluta scrobiculata Brocchi, 1814

= Subcancilla scrobiculata =

Extinct species of gastropod

Subcancilla scrobiculata is an extinct species of sea snail, a marine gastropod mollusk in the family Mitridae, the miters or miter snails.

Subspecies
Cancilla scrobiculata crosnieri Cernohorsky, 1970 (temporary name) (distribution: in the Atlantic Ocean off the mouth of the Congo river) (synonym: Cancilla scrobiculata crosnieri Cernohorsky, 1970)
