= Isara straminea =

Scientific classification
- Kingdom: Animalia
- Phylum: Mollusca
- Class: Gastropoda
- Subclass: Caenogastropoda
- Order: Neogastropoda
- Family: Mitridae
- Genus: Isara
- Species: I. straminea

Binomial name
- Isara straminea (A. Adams, 1853)

Synonyms
- Mitra fulgurita auct. non Reeve, 1844; Mitra multilirata A. Adams, 1853; Mitra straminea A. Adams, 1853; Pusia straminea (A. Adams, 1853); Mitra fluviimaris Pilsbry & McGinty, 1949; Mitra saldanha Matthews & Rios, 1970; Cancilla saldanha (Matthews & Rios, 1970)

Species of gastropod

Isara straminea is a species of sea snail, a marine gastropod mollusk in the family Mitridae, the miters or miter snails.
