= Cancilla larranagai =

Scientific classification
- Kingdom: Animalia
- Phylum: Mollusca
- Class: Gastropoda
- Subclass: Caenogastropoda
- Order: Neogastropoda
- Family: Mitridae
- Genus: Cancilla
- Species: C. larranagai

Binomial name
- Cancilla larranagai (Carcelles, 1947)

Synonyms
- Subcancilla larranagai (Carcelles, 1947); Mitra larranagai Carcelles, 1947 (original combination)

Species of gastropod

Cancilla larranagai is a species of sea snail, a marine gastropod mollusk in the family Mitridae, the miters or miter snails.
