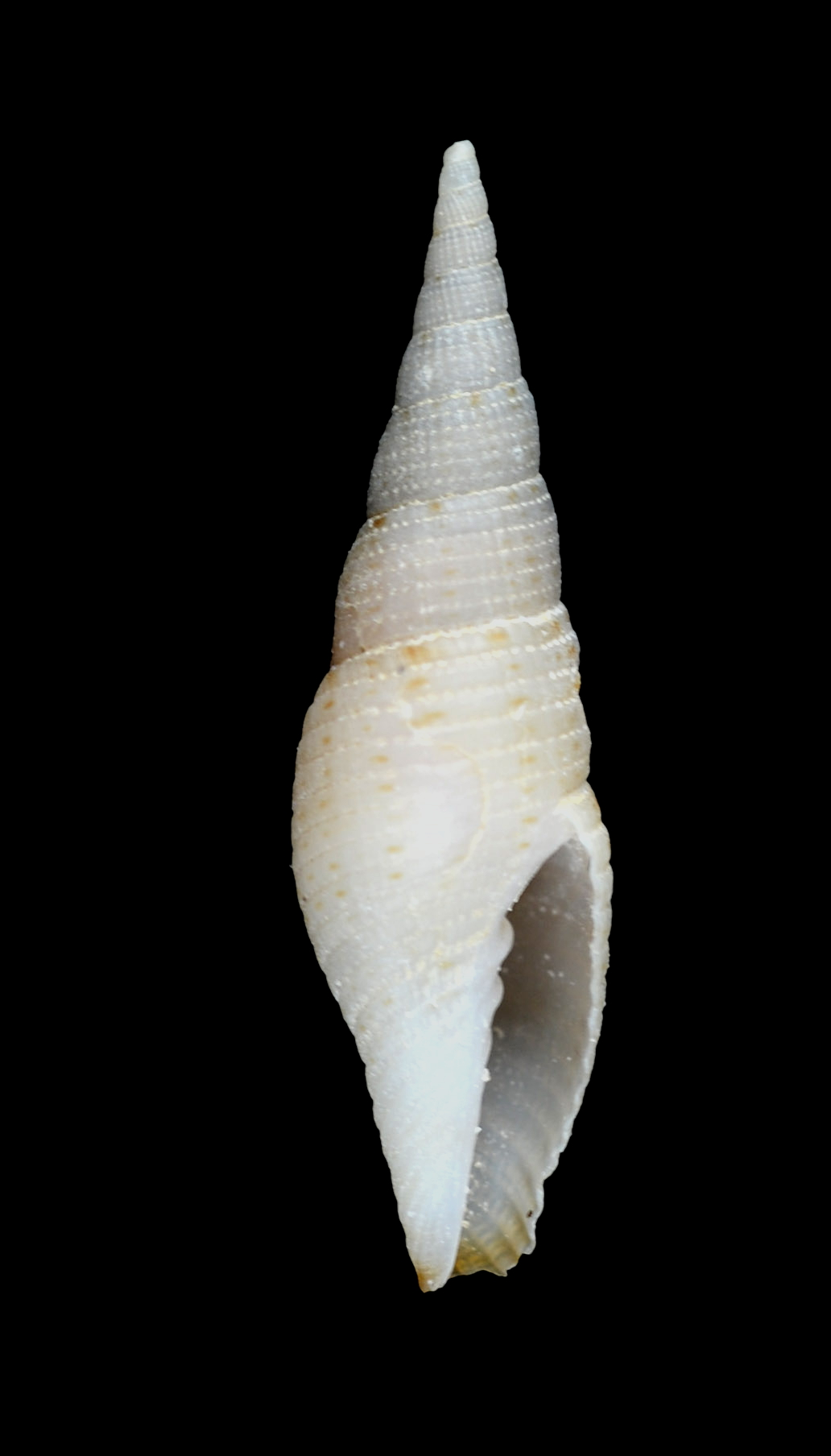
- Shell of Profundimitra planofilum (specimen at MNHN, Paris)

Scientific classification
- Kingdom: Animalia
- Phylum: Mollusca
- Class: Gastropoda
- Subclass: Caenogastropoda
- Order: Neogastropoda
- Family: Mitridae
- Genus: Profundimitra
- Species: P. planofilum

Binomial name
- Profundimitra planofilum (Huang, 2011)

Synonyms
- Cancilla planofilum Huang, 2011

= Profundimitra planofilum =

Species of gastropod

Profundimitra planofilum is a species of sea snail, a marine gastropod mollusk in the family Mitridae, the miters or miter snails.

== Description ==
Shell up to 32 mm in length, acuminate and slender. Color white, semitransparent at apex and porcelaneous near body. Spire sides are straight while whorl sides are slightly convex, and sutures are simple and prominent. Protoconch has 2.5 to 3 glassy and conoidal whorls. Teleoconch has 8 to 8.5 whorls.

== Distribution ==
Indo-Pacific, South China Sea, north to Taiwan and to the waters off Pratas Island, 200 to 600 m deep. The holotype has been caught by a fishing boat off north Taiwan. Two paratypes come from fishing boats working around Pratas Island.
