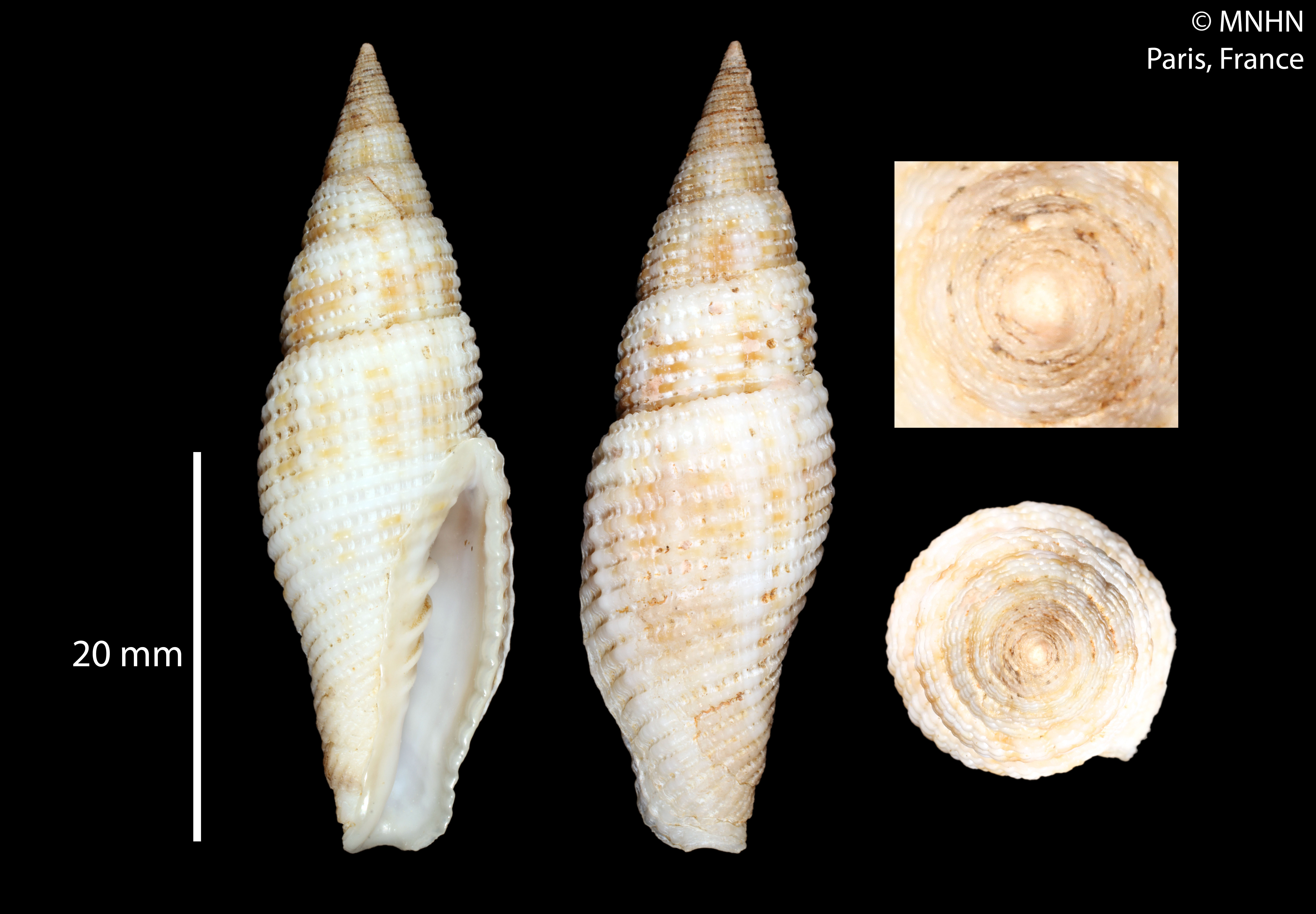
- Shell of Cancilla turneri (paratype at MNHN, Paris)

Scientific classification
- Kingdom: Animalia
- Phylum: Mollusca
- Class: Gastropoda
- Subclass: Caenogastropoda
- Order: Neogastropoda
- Family: Mitridae
- Genus: Cancilla
- Species: C. turneri

Binomial name
- Cancilla turneri Poppe, Tagaro & Salisbury, 2009

Synonyms
- Subcancilla turneri (Poppe, Tagaro & Salisbury, 2009)

= Cancilla turneri =

Species of gastropod

Cancilla turneri is a species of sea snail, a marine gastropod mollusk in the family Mitridae, the miters or miter snails.

== Description ==
The length of the shell varies between 20 mm and 50 mm.

== Distribution ==
This marine species occurs off the Philippines
