= Profundimitra abyssicola =

Scientific classification
- Kingdom: Animalia
- Phylum: Mollusca
- Class: Gastropoda
- Subclass: Caenogastropoda
- Order: Neogastropoda
- Family: Mitridae
- Genus: Profundimitra
- Species: P. abyssicola

Binomial name
- Profundimitra abyssicola (Schepman, 1911)

Synonyms
- Cancilla abyssicola (Schepman, 1911); Mitra abyssicola Schepman, 1911 (original combination); Subcancilla abyssicola (Schepman, 1911); Ziba abyssicola (Schepman, 1911); Ziba osapiensis Koperberg, 1931

Species of gastropod

Profundimitra abyssicola is a species of sea snail, a marine gastropod mollusk in the family Mitridae, the miters or miter snails.

== Description ==
The length of the shell varies between 13 mm and 100 mm.

== Distribution ==
This marine species occurs off Madagascar to Japan; off Northeast Australia and New Caledonia.
