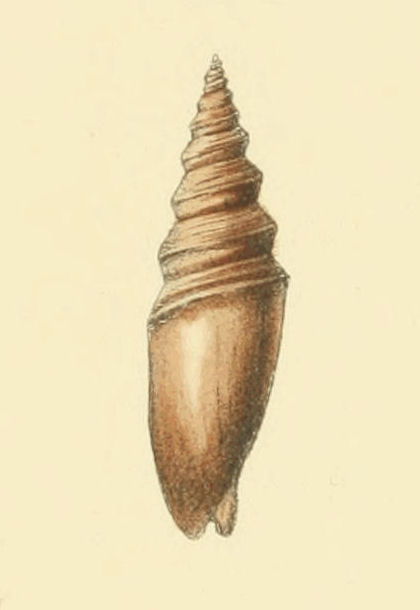
- Ziba carinata

Scientific classification
- Kingdom: Animalia
- Phylum: Mollusca
- Class: Gastropoda
- Subclass: Caenogastropoda
- Order: Neogastropoda
- Superfamily: Mitroidea
- Family: Mitridae
- Subfamily: Mitrinae
- Genus: Ziba; H. Adams & A. Adams, 1853

Type species
- Mitra carinata Swainson, 1824

Synonyms
- Cancilla (Ziba) H. Adams & A. Adams, 1853; Turricula (Ziba) H. Adams & A. Adams, 1853 (original rank)

= Ziba (gastropod) =

Genus of gastropods

Ziba is a genus of sea snails, marine gastropod mollusks in the subfamily Mitrinae of the family Mitridae.

== Species ==
The genus Ziba used to contain more than 40 species, but many were recently reassigned to other genera, including Imbricaria and Subcancilla. As of 2018, the genus Ziba contains the following species:

- Ziba carinata (Swainson, 1824)
- † Ziba fijiensis (Ladd, 1934)
- Ziba gambiana (Dohrn, 1861)
- Ziba ogoouensis Biraghi, 1984
- † Ziba waltercernohorskyi Harzhauser, Raven & Landau, 2018

Synonyms

- Ziba abyssicola (Schepman, 1911): synonym of Profundimitra abyssicola (Schepman, 1911)
- Ziba aglais B.-Q. Li & S.-P. Zhang, 2005: synonym of Domiporta aglais (B.-Q. Li & S.-P. Zhang, 2005) (original combination)
- Ziba amoena (A. Adams, 1853): synonym of Imbricaria amoena (A. Adams, 1853)
- Ziba annulata (Reeve, 1844): synonym of Imbricaria annulata (Reeve, 1844)
- Ziba astyagis (Dohrn, 1860): synonym of Imbricaria astyagis (Dohrn, 1860)
- Ziba attenuata (Broderip, 1836): synonym of Subcancilla attenuata (Broderip, 1836)
- Ziba bacillum (Lamarck, 1811): synonym of Imbricaria bacillum (Lamarck, 1811)
- Ziba bantamensis (Oostingh, 1939): synonym of Imbricaria bantamensis (Oostingh, 1939)
- Ziba calodinota (S. S. Berry, 1960): synonym of Subcancilla calodinota (S. S. Berry, 1960)
- Ziba candida (Reeve, 1845): synonym of Subcancilla candida (Reeve, 1845)
- Ziba cernohorskyi Rehder & B. R. Wilson, 1975: synonym of Imbricaria cernohorskyi (Rehder & B. R. Wilson, 1975) (original combination)
- Ziba cloveri (Cernohorsky, 1971): synonym of Imbricaria cloveri (Cernohorsky, 1971)
- Ziba dianneae (R. Salisbury & E. Guillot de Suduiraut, 2003): synonym of Scabricola dianneae (R. Salisbury & E. Guillot de Suduiraut, 2003)
- Ziba duplilirata (Reeve, 1845): synonym of Gemmulimitra duplilirata (Reeve, 1845)
- Ziba edithrexae (Sphon, 1976): synonym of Subcancilla edithrexae Sphon, 1976
- Ziba erythrogramma (Tomlin, 1931): synonym of Subcancilla erythrogramma (Tomlin, 1931)
- Ziba flammea (Quoy & Gaimard, 1833): synonym of Imbricaria flammea (Quoy & Gaimard, 1833)
- Ziba flammigera (Reeve, 1844): synonym of Imbricaria flammigera (Reeve, 1844)
- Ziba fulgetrum (Reeve, 1844): synonym of Imbricaria fulgetrum (Reeve, 1844)
- Ziba gigantea (Reeve, 1844): synonym of Subcancilla gigantea (Reeve, 1844): synonym of Panamitra gigantea (Reeve, 1844)
- Ziba heinickei (R. Salisbury & E. Guillot de Suduiraut, 2003): synonym of Cancilla heinickei (R. Salisbury & E. Guillot de Suduiraut, 2003)
- Ziba hrdlickai (R. Salisbury, 1994): synonym of Imbricaria hrdlickai (R. Salisbury, 1994)
- Ziba insculpta (A. Adams, 1853): synonym of Imbricaria insculpta (A. Adams, 1853)
- Ziba interlirata (Reeve, 1844): synonym of Imbricaria interlirata (Reeve, 1844)
- Ziba intersculpta (G. B. Sowerby II, 1870): synonym of Imbricaria intersculpta (G. B. Sowerby II, 1870)
- Ziba juttingae (Koperberg, 1931) †: synonym of Gemmulimitra duplilirata (Reeve, 1845) (junior subjective synonym)
- Ziba kermadecensis Cernohorsky, 1978: synonym of Imbricaria kermadecensis (Cernohorsky, 1978)
- Ziba maui (Kay, 1979): synonym of Imbricaria maui (Kay, 1979)
- Ziba padangensis (Thiele, 1925): synonym of Scabricola padangensis (Thiele, 1925)
- Ziba phorminx (S. S. Berry, 1969): synonym of Subcancilla phorminx (S. S. Berry, 1969)
- Ziba polycincta (H. Turner, 2007): synonym of Imbricaria polycincta (H. Turner, 2007)
- Ziba pretiosa (Reeve, 1844): synonym of Imbricaria pretiosa (Reeve, 1844)
- Ziba rehderi (J. H. Webb, 1958): synonym of Cancilla rehderi (J. H. Webb, 1958)
- Ziba rufilirata (A. Adams & Reeve, 1850): synonym of Imbricaria rufilirata (A. Adams & Reeve, 1850)
- Ziba salisburyi (Drivas & M. Jay, 1990): synonym of Imbricaria salisburyi (Drivas & M. Jay, 1990) (superseded combination)
- Ziba verrucosa (Reeve, 1845): synonym of Imbricaria verrucosa (Reeve, 1845)
