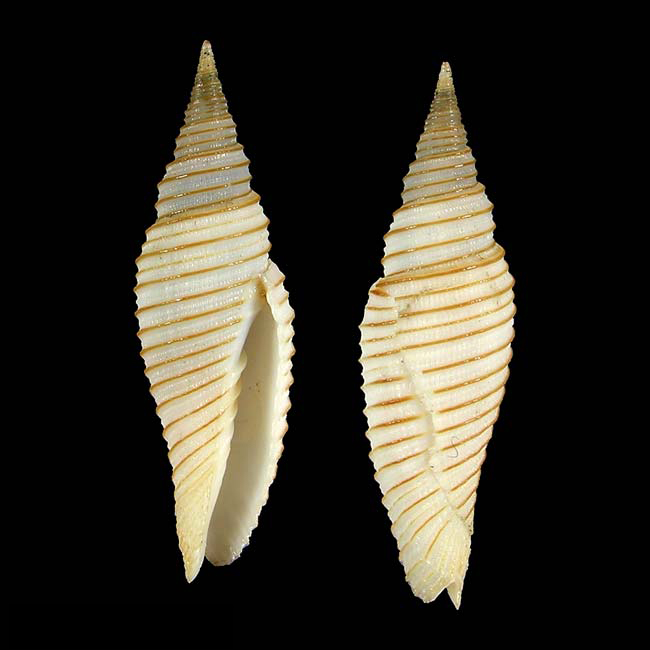

Scientific classification
- Kingdom: Animalia
- Phylum: Mollusca
- Class: Gastropoda
- Subclass: Caenogastropoda
- Order: Neogastropoda
- Family: Mitridae
- Genus: Imbricaria
- Species: I. pugnaxa

Binomial name
- Imbricaria pugnaxa (Poppe, Tagaro & Salisbury, 2009)

Synonyms
- Subcancilla pugnaxa Poppe, Tagaro & Salisbury, 2009

= Imbricaria pugnaxa =

Species of gastropod

Imbricaria pugnaxa is a species of sea snail, a marine gastropod mollusk in the family Mitridae, the miters or miter snails.

== Description ==
The length of the shell varies between 19 mm and 40 mm.

== Distribution ==
This marine species occurs off the Philippines.
