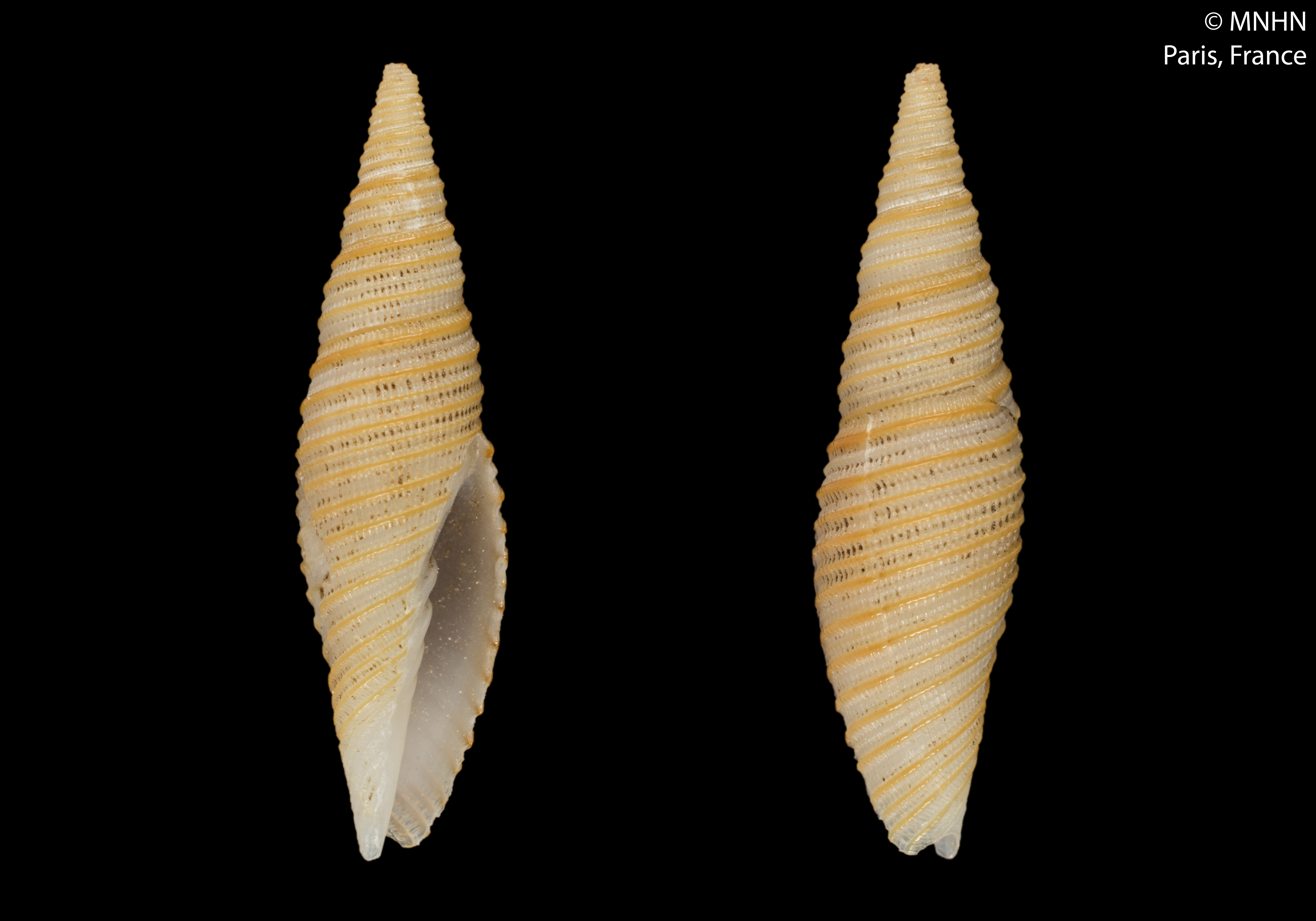

Scientific classification
- Kingdom: Animalia
- Phylum: Mollusca
- Class: Gastropoda
- Subclass: Caenogastropoda
- Order: Neogastropoda
- Superfamily: Mitroidea
- Family: Mitridae
- Subfamily: Imbricariinae
- Genus: Imbricaria
- Species: I. tahitiensis

Binomial name
- Imbricaria tahitiensis (Herrmann & Salisbury, 2012)

Synonyms
- Subcancilla tahitiensis Herrmann & Salisbury, 2012

= Imbricaria tahitiensis =

Species of gastropod

Imbricaria tahitiensis is a species of sea snail, a marine gastropod mollusk, in the family Mitridae, the miters or miter snails.

== Description ==
The length of the shell varies between 17 mm and 20 mm.

== Taxonomy ==
This species was originally described by Herrmann and Salisbury in their paper entitled "Three new Imbricariinae species from French Polynesia with remarks on ‘’Neocancilla arenacea’’ (Dunker, 1852) (Gastropoda: Mitridae)". It was published in 2012, Volume 51 (5-6) of the journal Gloria Maris (pp. 149-173). The species was originally named Subcancilla tahitiensis Herrmann & Salisbury, 2012. Following a peer reviewed paper written by Herrmann and his colleagues, new species were described within the Imbricariinae subfamily. After a thorough revision of the family Mitridae using molecular and morphological data, species were reclassified into different genera. These findings were published by Fedosov et al. in 2018. This included reclassifying species previously identified within the genus Subcancilla into the genus Imbricaria. It is still placed within the Imbricariinae subfamily.

== Distribution ==
This marine species occurs off Tahiti, in French Polynesia.
