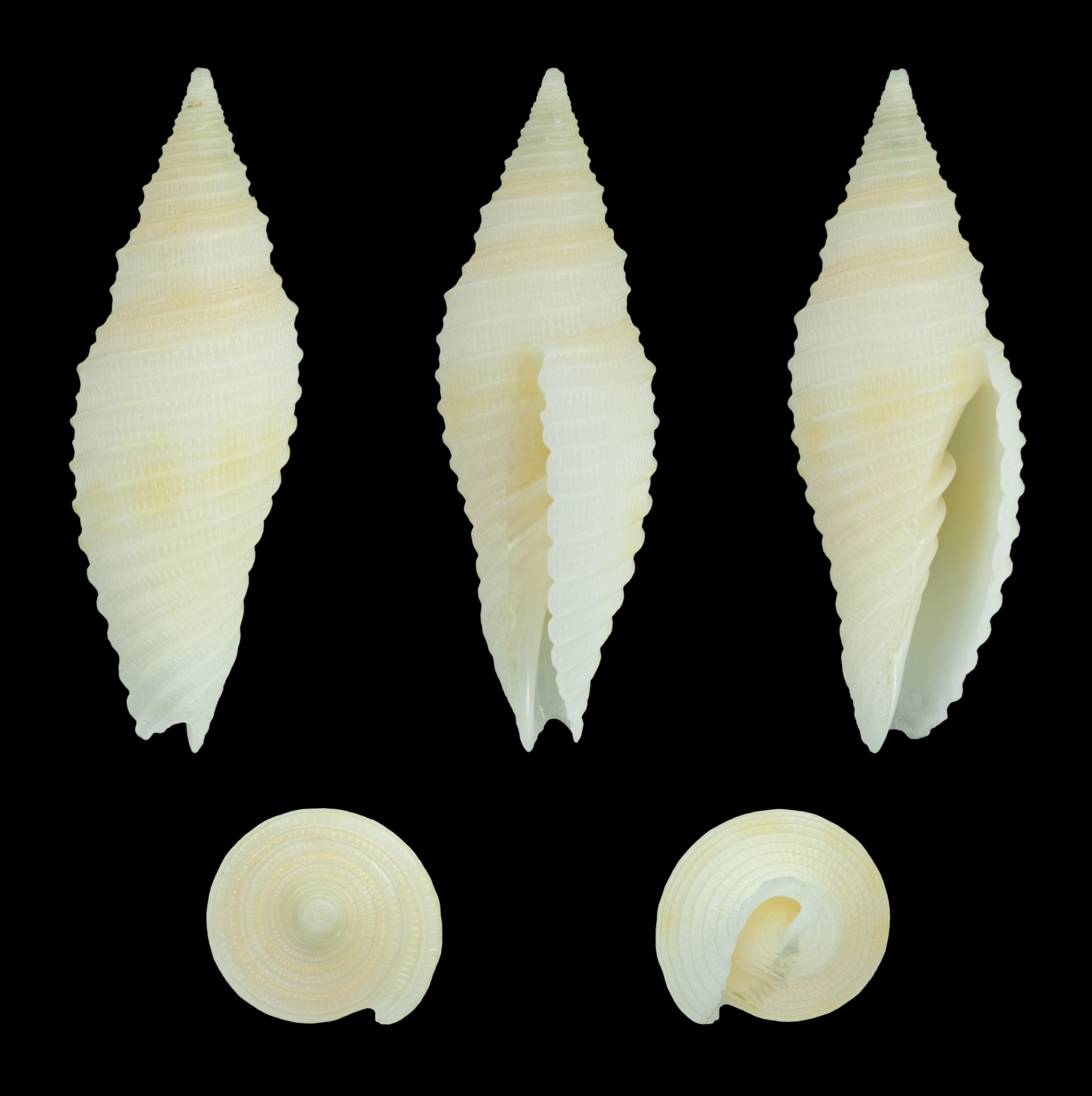
- Imbricaria baisei

Scientific classification
- Kingdom: Animalia
- Phylum: Mollusca
- Class: Gastropoda
- Subclass: Caenogastropoda
- Order: Neogastropoda
- Superfamily: Mitroidea
- Family: Mitridae
- Subfamily: Imbricariinae
- Genus: Imbricaria; Schumacher, 1817

Type species
- Imbricaria conica Schumacher, 1817

Synonyms
- Conoelix Swainson, 1821

= Imbricaria =

Genus of gastropods

Imbricaria is a genus of sea snails, marine gastropod mollusk in the family Mitridae, the miters or miter snails.

== Species ==
Species within the genus Imbricaria include:

- Imbricaria amoena (A. Adams, 1853)
- Imbricaria annulata (Reeve, 1844)
- Imbricaria armonica (T. Cossignani & V. Cossignani, 2005)
- Imbricaria astyagis (Dohrn, 1860)
- Imbricaria bacillum (Lamarck, 1811)
- Imbricaria baisei (Poppe, Tagaro & R. Salisbury, 2009)
- Imbricaria bantamensis (Oostingh, 1939)
- Imbricaria bellulavaria (Dekkers, Herrmann, Poppe & Tagaro, 2014)
- Imbricaria cernohorskyi (Rehder & B. R. Wilson, 1975)
- Imbricaria cloveri (Cernohorsky, 1971)
- Imbricaria conularis Lamarck, 1811)
- Imbricaria flammea (Quoy & Gaimard, 1833)
- Imbricaria flammigera (Reeve, 1844)
- Imbricaria fulgetrum (Reeve, 1844)
- Imbricaria hidalgoi (G. B. Sowerby III, 1913)
- Imbricaria hrdlickai (R. Salisbury, 1994)
- Imbricaria insculpta (A. Adams, 1853)
- Imbricaria interlirata (Reeve, 1844)
- Imbricaria intersculpta (G. B. Sowerby II, 1870)
- Imbricaria kermadecensis (Cernohorsky, 1978)
- Imbricaria maui (Kay, 1979)
- Imbricaria nadayaoi (Bozzetti, 1997)
- Imbricaria philpoppei (Poppe, Tagaro & R. Salisbury, 2009)
- Imbricaria polycincta (H. Turner, 2007)
- Imbricaria pretiosa (Reeve, 1844)
- Imbricaria pugnaxa (Poppe, Tagaro & R. Salisbury, 2009)
- Imbricaria ruberorbis (Dekkers, Herrmann, Poppe & Tagaro, 2014)
- Imbricaria rufilirata (A. Adams & Reeve, 1850)
- Imbricaria rufogyrata (Poppe, Tagaro & R. Salisbury, 2009)
- Imbricaria salisburyi (Drivas & Jay, 1990)
- Imbricaria tahitiensis (Herrmann & R. Salisbury, 2012)
- Imbricaria verrucosa (Reeve, 1845)
- Imbricaria yagurai (Kira, 1959)
- Imbricaria zetema (Dekkers, Herrmann, Poppe & Tagaro, 2014)

Species brought into synonymy

- Imbricaria bicolor: synonym of Scabricola bicolor (Swainson, 1824)
- Imbricaria carbonacea (Hinds, 1844): synonym of Imbricariopsis carbonacea (Hinds, 1844)
- Imbricaria conica Schumacher, 1817: synonym of Imbricaria conularis (Lamarck, 1811)
- Imbricaria conovula: synonym of Imbricariopsis conovula (Quoy & Gaimard, 1833)
- Imbricaria conus: synonym of Pterygia conus (Gmelin, 1791)
- Imbricaria filum (Wood, 1828): synonym of Scabricola bicolor (Swainson, 1824)
- Imbricaria olivaeformis (Swainson, 1821): synonym of Swainsonia olivaeformis (Swainson, 1821)
- Imbricaria porphyria Verco, 1896: synonym of Peculator porphyria (Verco, 1896)
- Imbricaria punctata (Swainson, 1821): synonym of Imbricariopsis punctata (Swainson, 1821)
- Imbricaria vanikorensis: synonym of Imbricariopsis vanikorensis (Quoy & Gaimard, 1833)

== Distribution ==
Species from this genus can be found in the Indian Ocean along Chagos and Mauritius.
