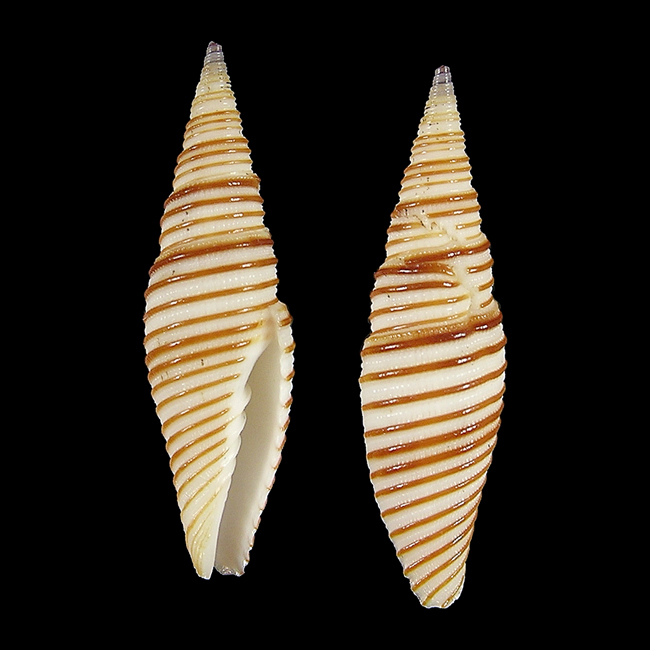

Scientific classification
- Kingdom: Animalia
- Phylum: Mollusca
- Class: Gastropoda
- Subclass: Caenogastropoda
- Order: Neogastropoda
- Family: Mitridae
- Genus: Imbricaria
- Species: I. rufogyrata

Binomial name
- Imbricaria rufogyrata (Poppe, Tagaro & Salisbury, 2009)

Synonyms
- Subcancilla rufogyrata Poppe, Tagaro & R. Salisbury, 2009 (original combination)

= Imbricaria rufogyrata =

Species of gastropod

Imbricaria rufogyrata is a species of sea snail, a marine gastropod mollusc in the family Mitridae.

== Description ==
The length of the shell varies between 23 mm and 35 mm.

== Original description ==
- (of Subcancilla rufogyrata Poppe, Tagaro & Salisbury, 2009) Poppe G.T., Tagaro S. & Salisbury R. (2009) New species of Mitridae and Costellariidae from the Philippines. Visaya Suppl. 4: 1-86.
