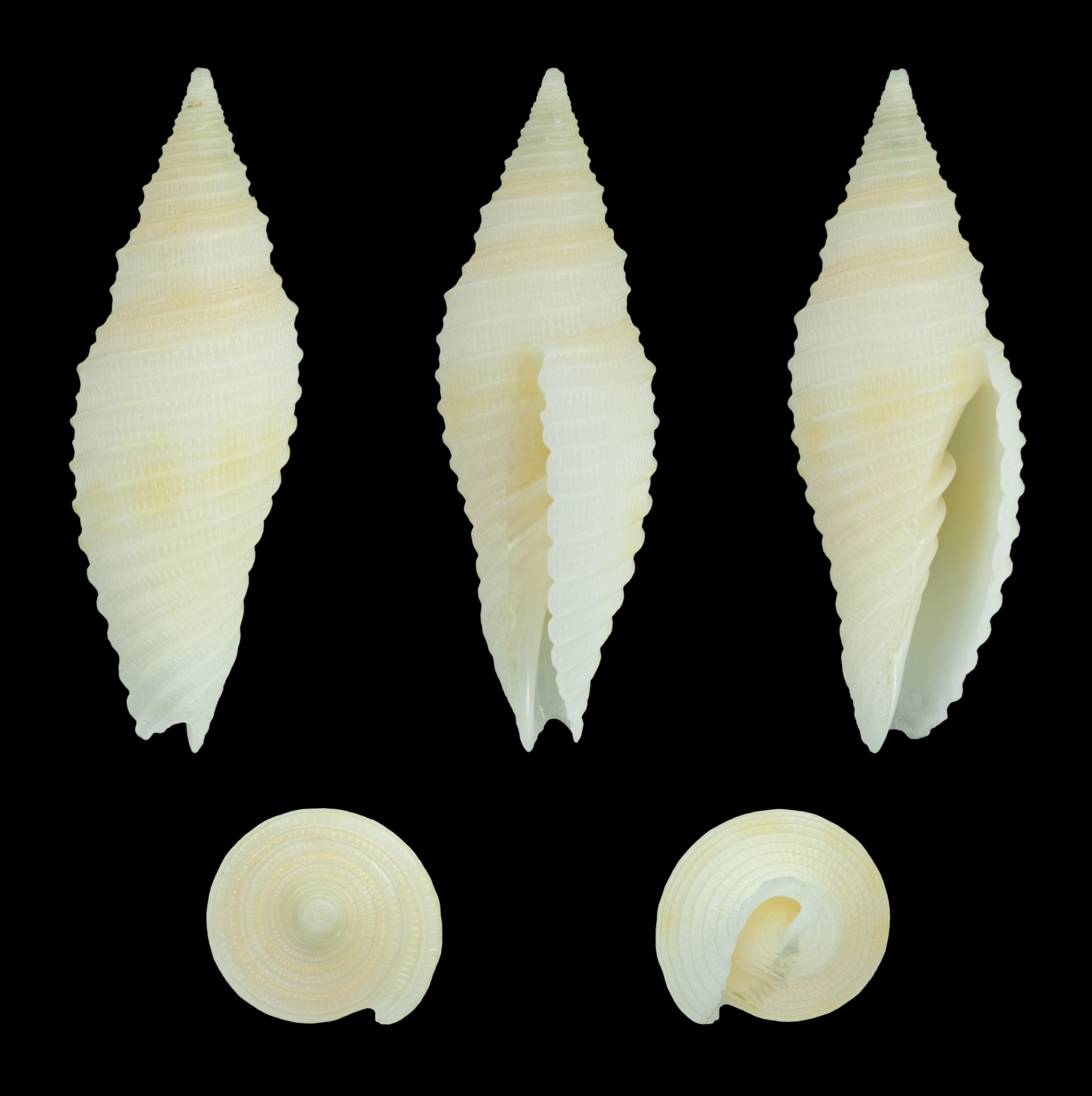

Scientific classification
- Kingdom: Animalia
- Phylum: Mollusca
- Class: Gastropoda
- Subclass: Caenogastropoda
- Order: Neogastropoda
- Family: Mitridae
- Genus: Imbricaria
- Species: I. baisei

Binomial name
- Imbricaria baisei (Poppe, Tagaro & Salisbury, 2009)

Synonyms
- Subcancilla baisei Poppe, Tagaro & Salisbury, 2009

= Imbricaria baisei =

Species of gastropod

Imbricaria baisei is a species of sea snail, a marine gastropod mollusk in the family Mitridae, the miters or miter snails.

== Original Description ==
- (of Subcancilla baisei Poppe, Tagaro & Salisbury, 2009) Poppe G.T., Tagaro S. & Salisbury R. (2009) New species of Mitridae and Costellariidae from the Philippines. Visaya Suppl. 4: 1-86.
