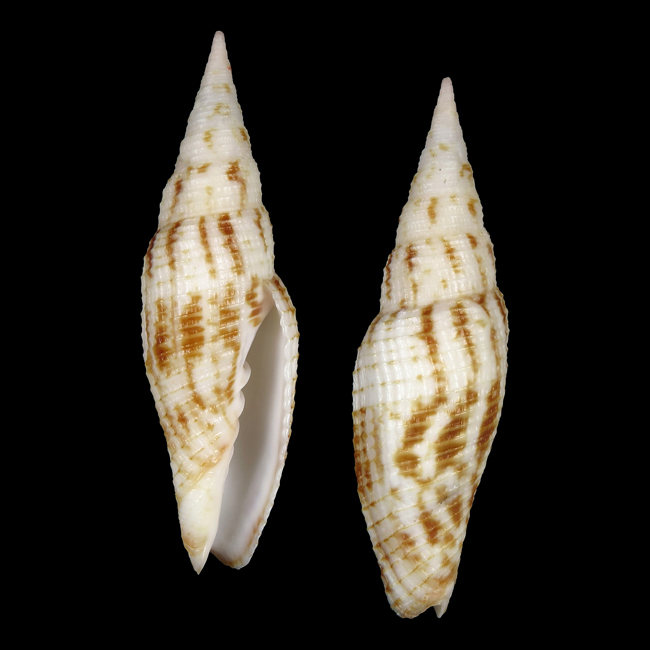

Scientific classification
- Kingdom: Animalia
- Phylum: Mollusca
- Class: Gastropoda
- Subclass: Caenogastropoda
- Order: Neogastropoda
- Family: Mitridae
- Genus: Imbricaria
- Species: I. bellulavaria

Binomial name
- Imbricaria bellulavaria (Dekkers, Herrmann, Poppe & Tagaro, 2014)

Synonyms
- Subcancilla bellulavaria Dekkers, Herrmann, Poppe & Tagaro, 2014 (original combination)

= Imbricaria bellulavaria =

Species of gastropod

Imbricaria bellulavaria is a species of sea snail, a marine gastropod mollusc in the family Mitridae.

== Description ==
The length of the shell varies between 34 mm and 53 mm.

== Distribution ==
This marine species occurs off the Philippines.
