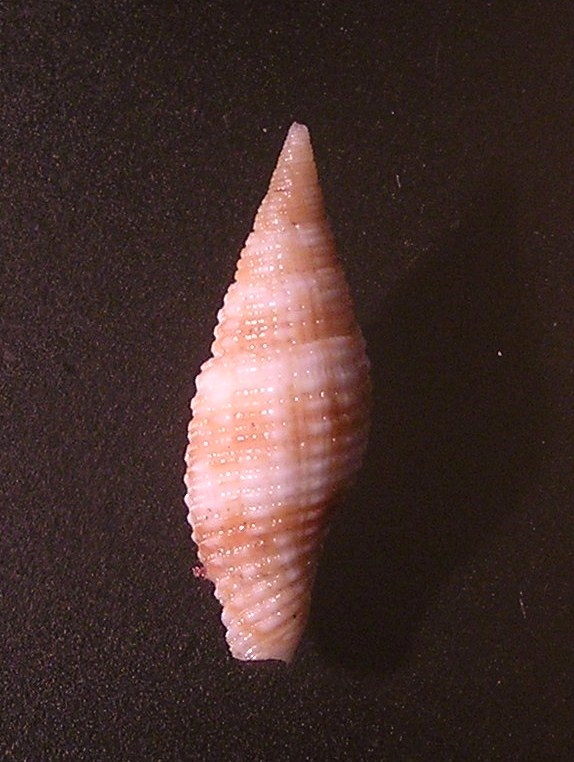
- Shell of Imbricaria armonica

Scientific classification
- Kingdom: Animalia
- Phylum: Mollusca
- Class: Gastropoda
- Subclass: Caenogastropoda
- Order: Neogastropoda
- Superfamily: Mitroidea
- Family: Mitridae
- Subfamily: Imbricariinae
- Genus: Imbricaria
- Species: I. armonica

Binomial name
- Imbricaria armonica (T. Cossignani & V. Cossignani, 2005)

Synonyms
- Cancilla armonica T. Cossignani & V. Cossignani, 2005; Neocancilla armonica (T. Cossignani & V. Cossignani, 2005)

= Imbricaria armonica =

Species of gastropod

Imbricaria armonica is a species of sea snail, a marine gastropod mollusk, in the family Mitridae, the miters or miter snails.
