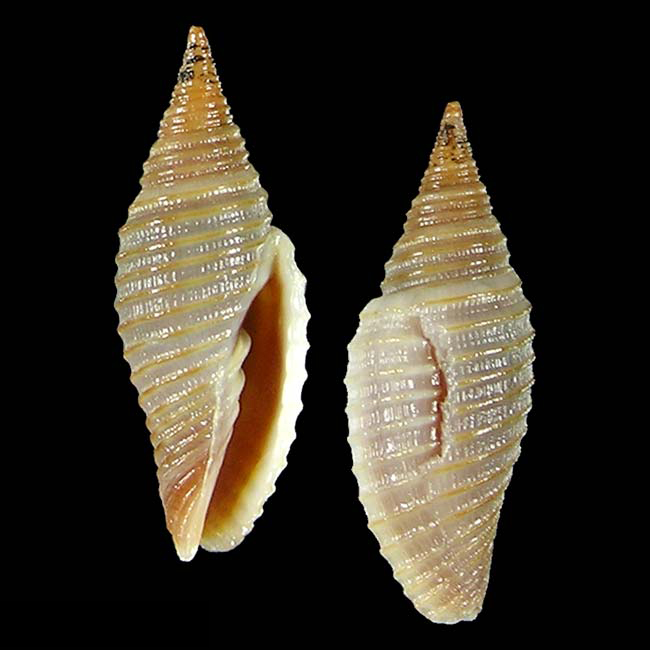

Scientific classification
- Kingdom: Animalia
- Phylum: Mollusca
- Class: Gastropoda
- Subclass: Caenogastropoda
- Order: Neogastropoda
- Family: Mitridae
- Genus: Imbricaria
- Species: I. philpoppei

Binomial name
- Imbricaria philpoppei (Poppe, Tagaro & Salisbury, 2009)

Synonyms
- Subcancilla philpoppei Poppe, Tagaro & Salisbury, 2009

= Imbricaria philpoppei =

Species of gastropod

Imbricaria philpoppei is a species of sea snail, a marine gastropod mollusc in the family Mitridae, the miters or miter snails.

== Description ==
The length of the shell varies between 14 mm and 21 mm.

== Distribution ==
This marine species occurs off the Philippines.
