= Ziba waltercernohorskyi =

Scientific classification
- Kingdom: Animalia
- Phylum: Mollusca
- Class: Gastropoda
- Subclass: Caenogastropoda
- Order: Neogastropoda
- Family: Mitridae
- Subfamily: Mitrinae
- Genus: Ziba
- Species: †Z. waltercernohorskyi

Binomial name
- †Ziba waltercernohorskyi Harzhauser, Raven & Landau, 2018

Species of gastropod

Ziba waltercernohorskyi is an extinct species of sea snail, a marine gastropod mollusk in the family Mitridae, the miters or miter snails.

== Distribution ==
Fossils of this marine species were found in Late Miocene strata on Brunei.
