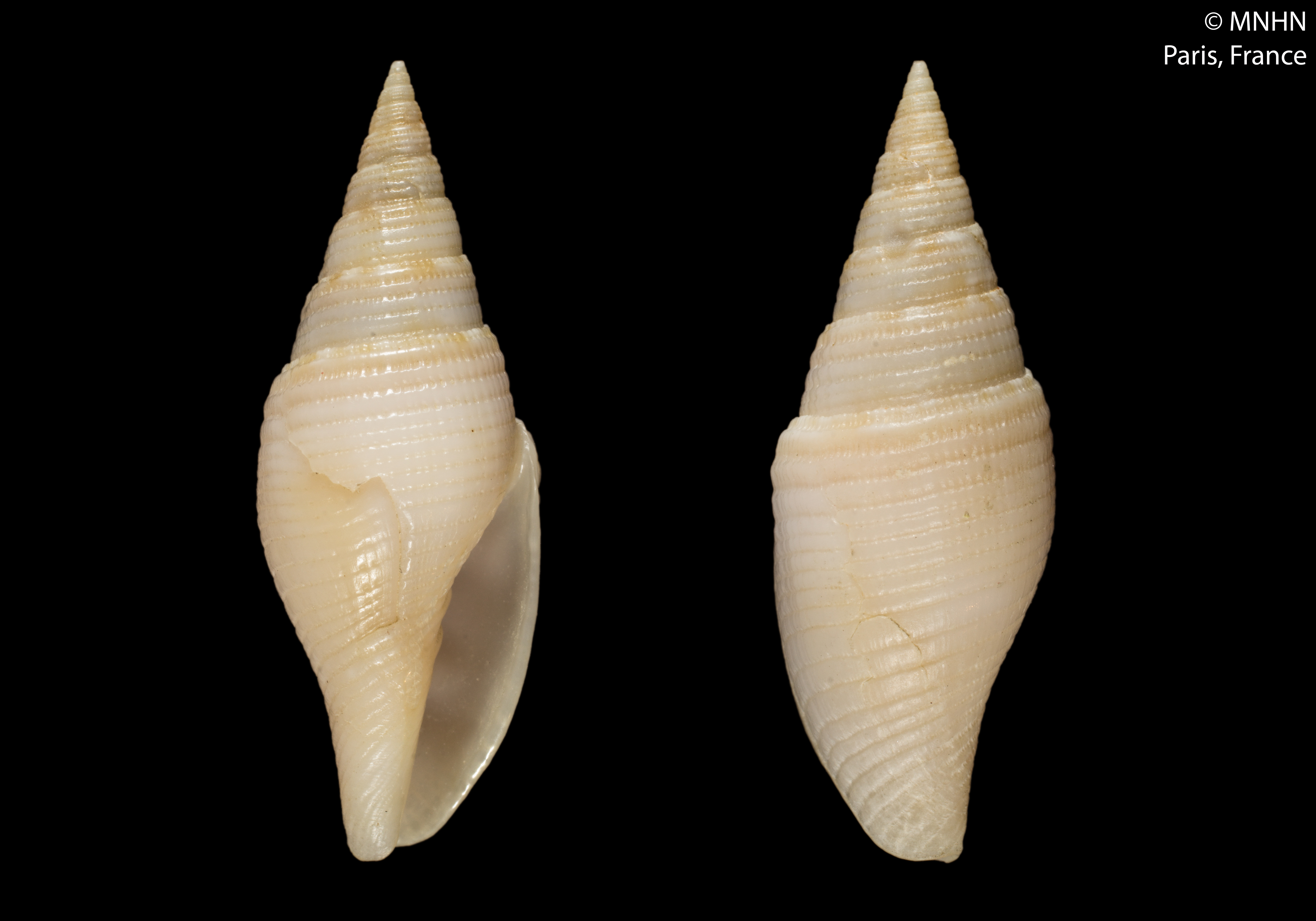
- Shell of Imbricaria nadayaoi (holotype at MNHN, Paris)

Scientific classification
- Kingdom: Animalia
- Phylum: Mollusca
- Class: Gastropoda
- Subclass: Caenogastropoda
- Order: Neogastropoda
- Family: Mitridae
- Genus: Imbricaria
- Species: I. nadayaoi

Binomial name
- Imbricaria nadayaoi (Bozzetti, 1997)

Synonyms
- Cancilla nadayaoi (Bozzetti, 1997); Mitra (Mitra) nadayaoi Bozzetti, 1997 (basionym); Mitra nadayaoi Bozzetti, 1997

= Imbricaria nadayaoi =

Species of gastropod

Imbricaria nadayaoi is a species of sea snail, a marine gastropod mollusk in the family Mitridae, the miters or miter snails.

== Description ==
The length of the shell attains 26.9 mm.

== Distribution ==
This marine species occurs off the Philippines.
