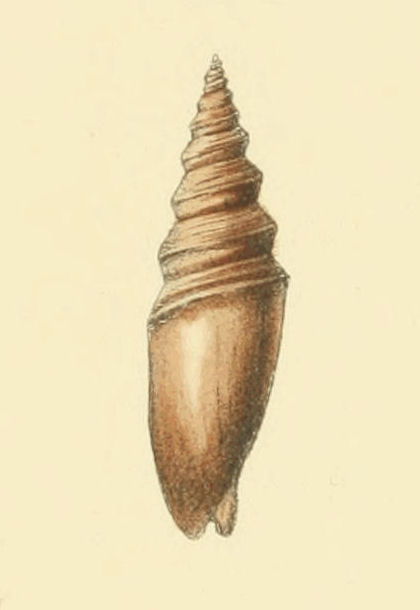

Scientific classification
- Kingdom: Animalia
- Phylum: Mollusca
- Class: Gastropoda
- Subclass: Caenogastropoda
- Order: Neogastropoda
- Family: Mitridae
- Subfamily: Mitrinae
- Genus: Ziba
- Species: Z. carinata

Binomial name
- Ziba carinata (Swainson, 1824)

Synonyms
- Mitra carinata Swainson, 1824 (original combination)

= Ziba carinata =

Species of gastropod

Ziba carinata is a species of sea snail, a marine gastropod mollusk in the family Mitridae, the miters or miter snails.

== Description ==
The species was first described by William Swainson under the name Mitra carinata. The shell is slender, fusiform and brown; the whorls have a single carinated ridge and are striated transversely near the suture. The spire is of equal length with the aperture. The shoulder of the body whorl and the middle of the spiral whorls are crossed by a carinated ridge. Between which and the suture are two or three elevated transverse striae. The rest of the shell is quite smooth. The aperture is white and smooth within. The inner lip is marginated. The columella is 4-plaited. It is covered by a uniform brown epidermis, beneath which the color is yellowish. The base is deeply emarginate and slightly recurved.

== Distribution ==
The type specimen was found on the coast of Sierra Leone. and Ghana and Gabon
