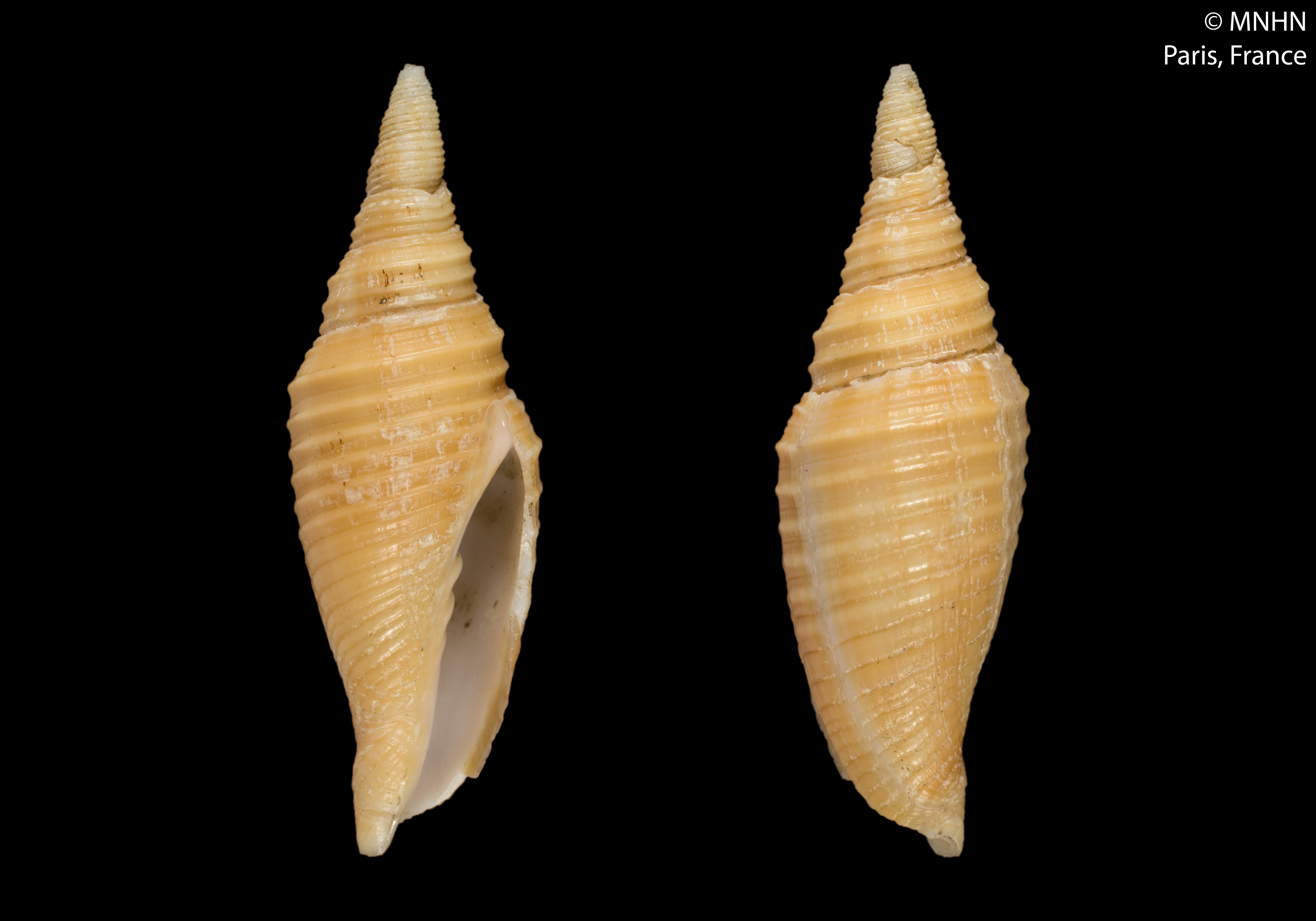

Scientific classification
- Kingdom: Animalia
- Phylum: Mollusca
- Class: Gastropoda
- Subclass: Caenogastropoda
- Order: Neogastropoda
- Family: Mitridae
- Genus: Ziba
- Species: Z. ogoouensis

Binomial name
- Ziba ogoouensis Biraghi, 1984

= Ziba ogoouensis =

Species of gastropod

Ziba ogoouensis is a species of sea snail, a marine gastropod mollusk in the family Mitridae, the miters or miter snails.

== Description ==
The length of the shell varies between 25 mm and 40 mm.

== Distribution ==
This marine species occurs off Gabon.
