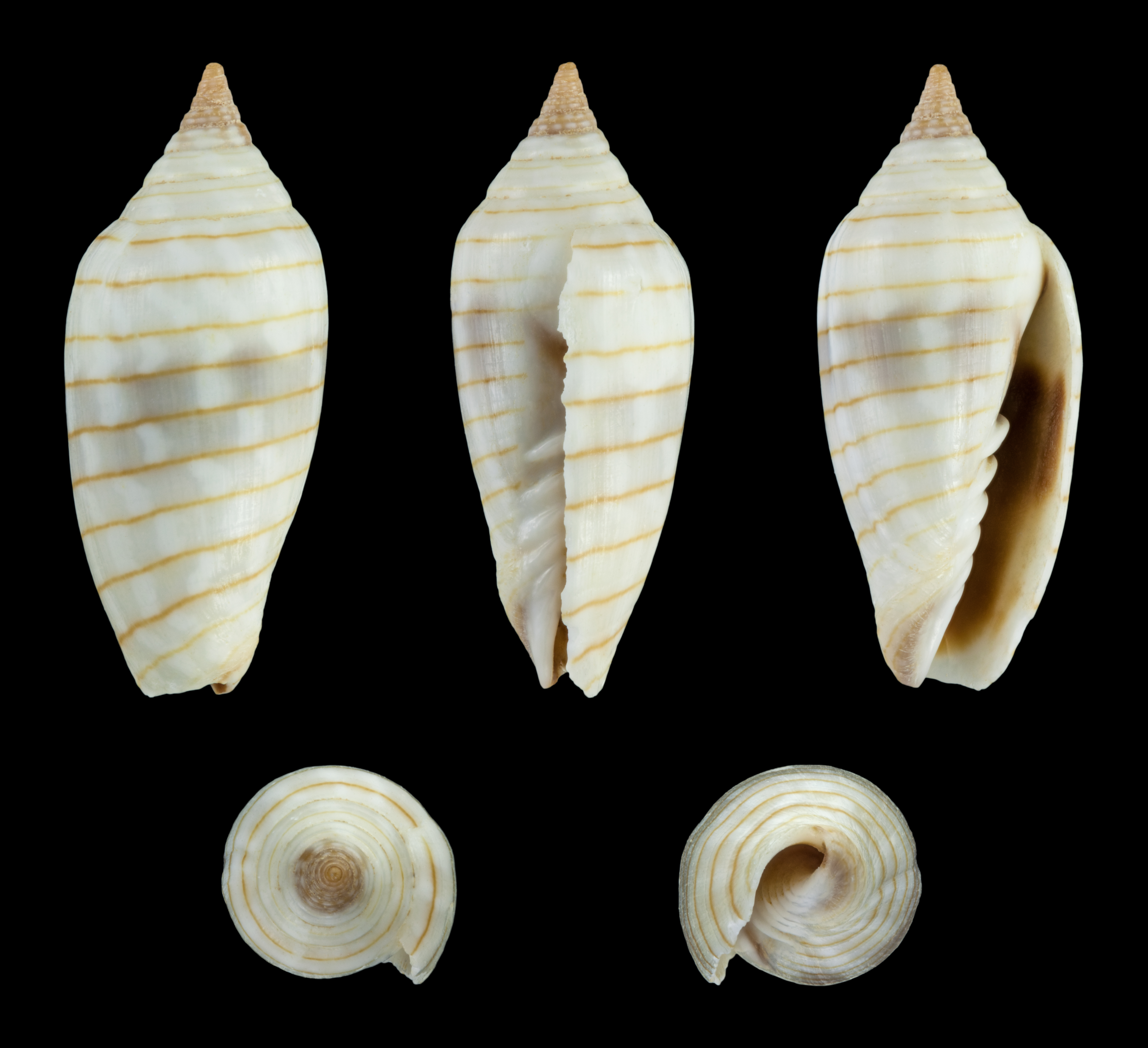

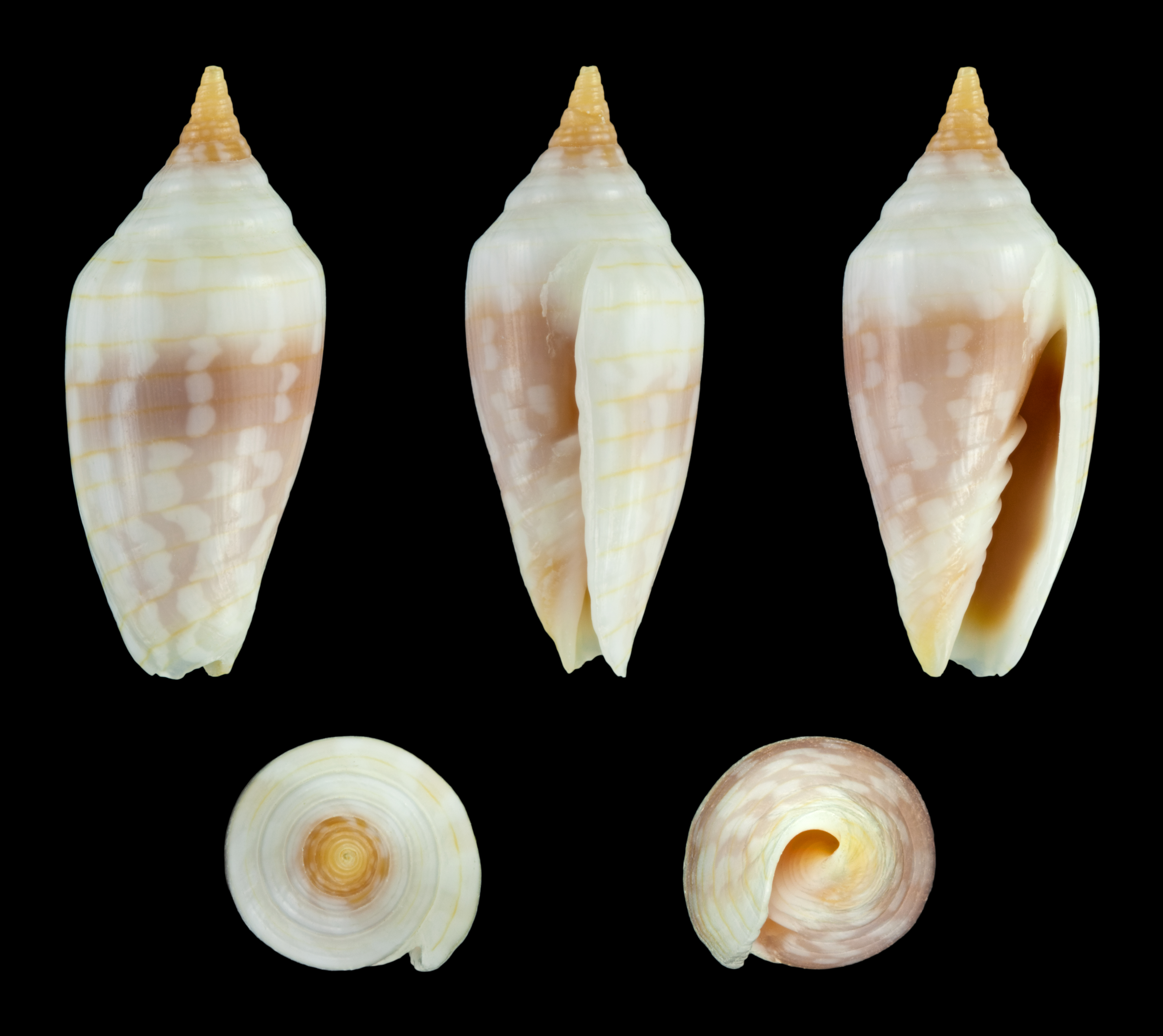

Scientific classification
- Kingdom: Animalia
- Phylum: Mollusca
- Class: Gastropoda
- Subclass: Caenogastropoda
- Order: Neogastropoda
- Family: Mitridae
- Genus: Imbricaria
- Species: I. conularis

Binomial name
- Imbricaria conularis (Lamarck, 1811)

Synonyms
- Conoelix lineatus Swainson, 1821; Imbricaria conica Schumacher, 1817; Imbricaria conularis f. crouani (Crosse, 1868); Mitra conularis Lamarck, 1811 (original combination)

= Imbricaria conularis =

Species of gastropod

Imbricaria conularis, common name the cone mitre, is a species of sea snail, a marine gastropod mollusc in the family Mitridae, the miters or miter snails.

The species was first described by the French naturalist Jean-Baptiste Lamarck in 1811, under the original name of Mitra conularis (published in the Annales du Muséum d’Histoire Naturelle). It was later placed in the genus Imbricaria (and is now classified in the subfamily Imbricariinae and the family Mitridae).

The following names are regarded as synonyms: Conoelix lineatus Swainson, 1821; Imbricaria conica Schumacher, 1817; Imbricaria conularis f. crouani (Crosse, 1868); and Mitra conularis Lamarck, 1811 (the original combination).

The type locality of the original description is Vanikoro Island, Solomon Islands.

== Description ==
The length of the shell varies between 13 mm and 26 mm.

The species is benthic and tropical, found at depths from intertidal to 52 m. The species was found in coral sand, sand, and similar substrata in intertidal, shallow subtidal, and subtidal habitats. Like other members of the family Mitridae, this species does not broadcast spawn; this family is also notable for lacking a trochophore larval stage.

== Distribution ==
This marine species occurs off Australia, the Philippines, Papua New Guinea and French Polynesia.
