= Ziba fijiensis =

Scientific classification
- Kingdom: Animalia
- Phylum: Mollusca
- Class: Gastropoda
- Subclass: Caenogastropoda
- Order: Neogastropoda
- Family: Mitridae
- Subfamily: Mitrinae
- Genus: Ziba
- Species: Z. fijiensis

Binomial name
- Ziba fijiensis (Ladd, 1934)

Synonyms
- † Mitra (Cancilla) menkrawitensis Beets, 1941; † Mitra (Tiara) fijiensis Ladd, 1934 (superseded combination); † Mitra fijiensis Ladd, 1934 (superseded combination); † Mitra menkrawitensis Beets, 1941

Species of gastropod

Ziba fijiensis is an extinct species of sea snail, a marine gastropod mollusk in the family Mitridae, the miters or miter snails.

== Distribution ==
Fossils of this marine species were found in Late Miocene strata on Fiji and Borneo.
