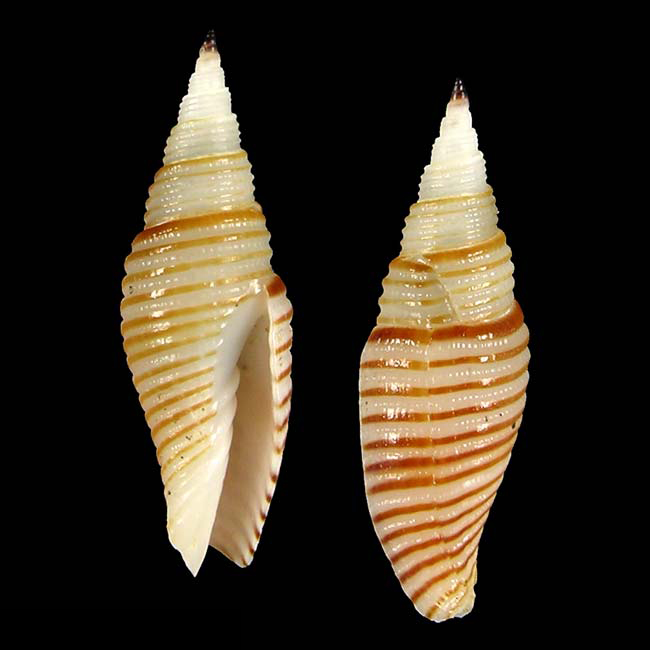
- Shell of Imbricaria ruberorbis

Scientific classification
- Kingdom: Animalia
- Phylum: Mollusca
- Class: Gastropoda
- Subclass: Caenogastropoda
- Order: Neogastropoda
- Family: Mitridae
- Genus: Imbricaria
- Species: I. ruberorbis

Binomial name
- Imbricaria ruberorbis (Dekkers, Herrmann, Poppe & Tagaro, 2014)

Synonyms
- Subcancilla ruberorbis Dekkers, Herrmann, Poppe & Tagaro, 2014 (original combination)

= Imbricaria ruberorbis =

Species of gastropod

Imbricaria ruberorbis is a species of sea snail, a marine gastropod mollusc in the family Mitridae.

== Description ==
The length of the shell varies between 14 mm and 30 mm.

== Original description ==
(of Subcancilla ruberorbis Dekkers, Herrmann, Poppe & Tagaro, 2014) Dekkers A.M., Herrmann M., Poppe G.T. & Tagaro S.P. (2014) Three new species of Subcancilla from the Pacific Ocean (Gastropoda: Mitridae). Visaya 4(2): 39-48. [May 2014] page(s): 40

== Distribution ==
This marine species occurs off the Philippines.
