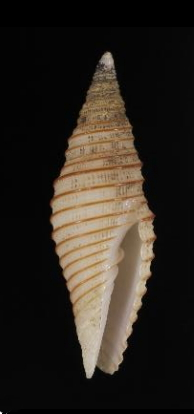
- Shell of Imbricaria yagurai (specimen at MNHN, Paris)

Scientific classification
- Kingdom: Animalia
- Phylum: Mollusca
- Class: Gastropoda
- Subclass: Caenogastropoda
- Order: Neogastropoda
- Superfamily: Mitroidea
- Family: Mitridae
- Subfamily: Imbricariinae
- Genus: Imbricaria
- Species: I. yagurai

Binomial name
- Imbricaria yagurai (Kira, 1959)

Synonyms
- Mitra (Tiara) yagurai Kira, 1959; Mitra yagurai Kira, 1959; Subcancilla yagurai (Kira, 1959)

= Imbricaria yagurai =

Species of gastropod

Imbricaria yagurai is a species of sea snail, a marine gastropod mollusk, in the family Mitridae, the miters or miter snails.

== Description ==
The length of the shell attains 35 mm.

== Distribution ==
This marine species occurs off Papua New Guinea and Vanuatu.
