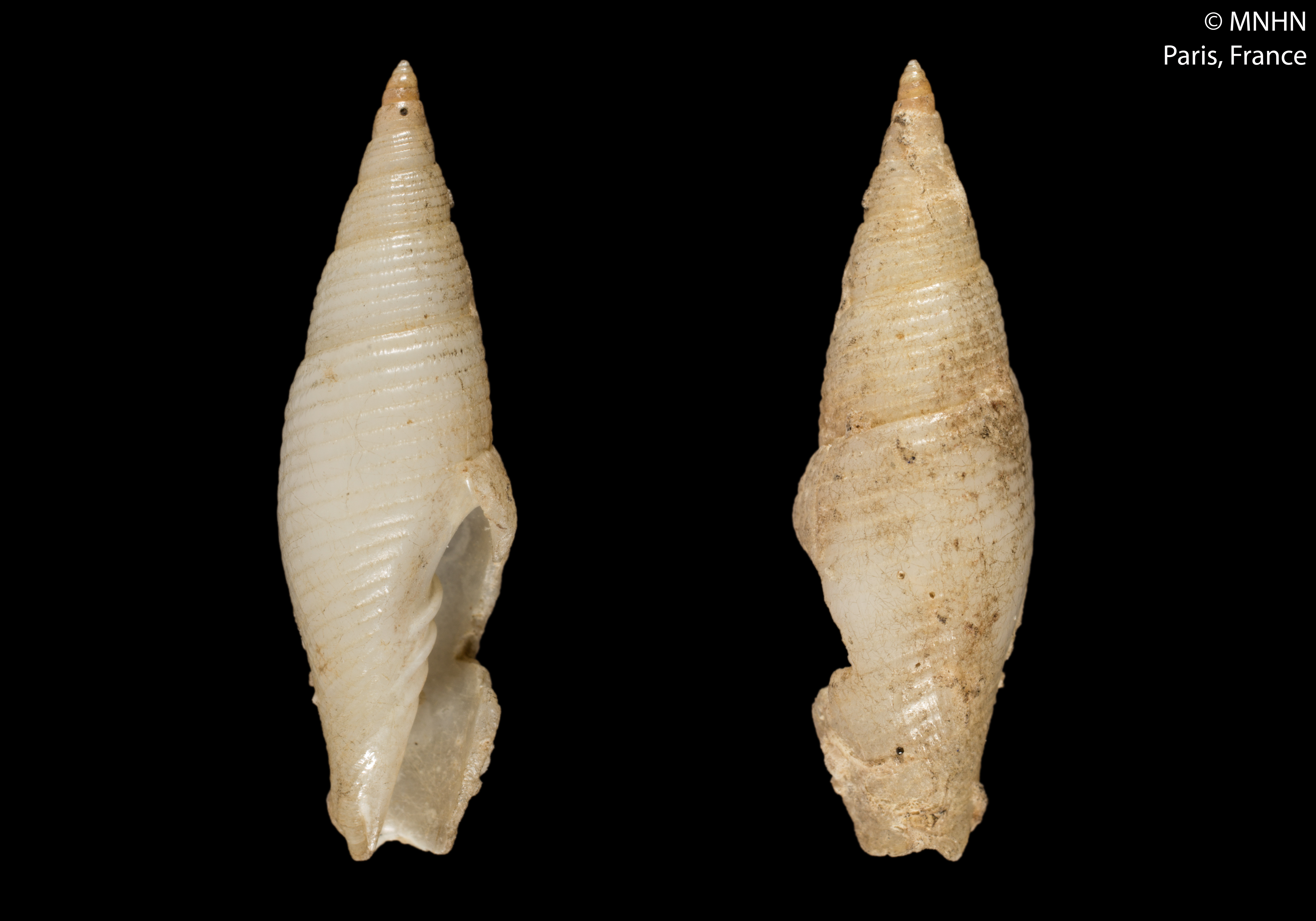
- Shell of Ziba gambiana (holotype at MNHN, Paris)

Scientific classification
- Kingdom: Animalia
- Phylum: Mollusca
- Class: Gastropoda
- Subclass: Caenogastropoda
- Order: Neogastropoda
- Family: Mitridae
- Subfamily: Mitrinae
- Genus: Ziba
- Species: Z. gambiana

Binomial name
- Ziba gambiana (Dohrn, 1861)

Synonyms
- Mitra gambiana Dohrn, 1861

= Ziba gambiana =

Species of gastropod

Ziba gambiana is a species of sea snail, a marine gastropod mollusk in the family Mitridae, the miters or miter snails.

== Description ==
The length of the shell varies between 18 mm and 45 mm.

(Original description in Latin) The spindle-shaped shell is spirally sulcate and carinate at the suture. The acute spire is elongate and contains 7 - 8 angulate whorls. The body whorl is attenuate at the base. The aperture is white within. The outer lip is simple. The columella has four folds.

== Distribution ==
This species occurs in the Atlantic Ocean off West Africa, Mauritania, Senegal and Angola.
