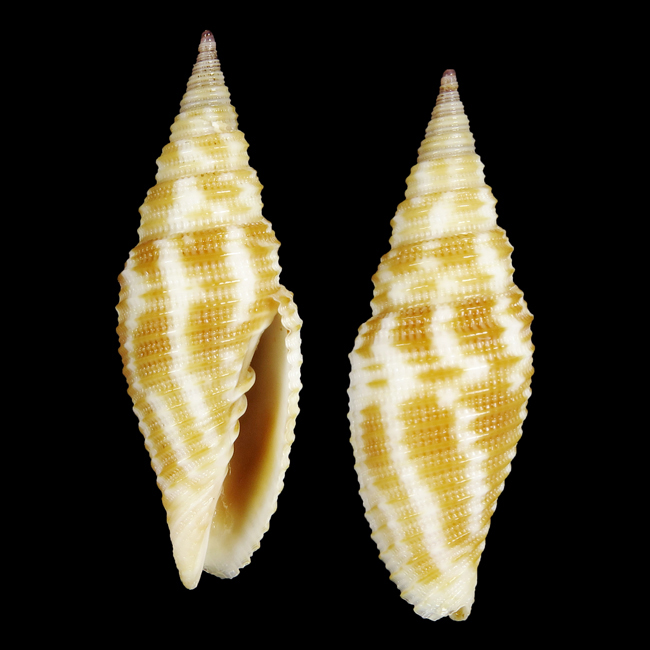

Scientific classification
- Kingdom: Animalia
- Phylum: Mollusca
- Class: Gastropoda
- Subclass: Caenogastropoda
- Order: Neogastropoda
- Family: Mitridae
- Genus: Imbricaria
- Species: I. zetema

Binomial name
- Imbricaria zetema (Dekkers, Herrmann, Poppe & Tagaro, 2014)

Synonyms
- Subcancilla zetema Dekkers, Herrmann, Poppe & Tagaro, 2014 (original combination)

= Imbricaria zetema =

Species of gastropod

Imbricaria zetema (previously known as Subcancilla zetema) is a species of sea snail, a marine gastropoda mollusc in the family Mitridae.

== Description ==
The length of the shell varies between 19 mm and 40 mm though found shells can get as small as 17 mm.

Their feeding type is described as being a predator.

== Distribution ==
This marine species occurs off the Philippines; North Borneo and Papua New Guinea.

== Original description ==
- Dekkers A.M., Herrmann M., Poppe G.T. & Tagaro S.P. (2014) Three new species of Subcancilla from the Pacific Ocean (Gastropoda: Mitridae). Visaya 4(2): 39-48. [May 2014] page(s): 43.
