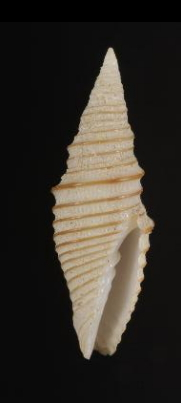
- Shell of Imbricaria hidalgoi (specimen at MNHN, Paris)

Scientific classification
- Kingdom: Animalia
- Phylum: Mollusca
- Class: Gastropoda
- Subclass: Caenogastropoda
- Order: Neogastropoda
- Superfamily: Mitroidea
- Family: Mitridae
- Subfamily: Imbricariinae
- Genus: Imbricaria
- Species: I. hidalgoi

Binomial name
- Imbricaria hidalgoi (G. B. Sowerby III, 1913)

Synonyms
- Mitra hidalgoi G. B. Sowerby III, 1913; Subcancilla hidalgoi (G. B. Sowerby III, 1913)

= Imbricaria hidalgoi =

Species of gastropod

Imbricaria hidalgoi is a species of sea snail, a marine gastropod mollusk, in the family Mitridae, the miters or miter snails.
