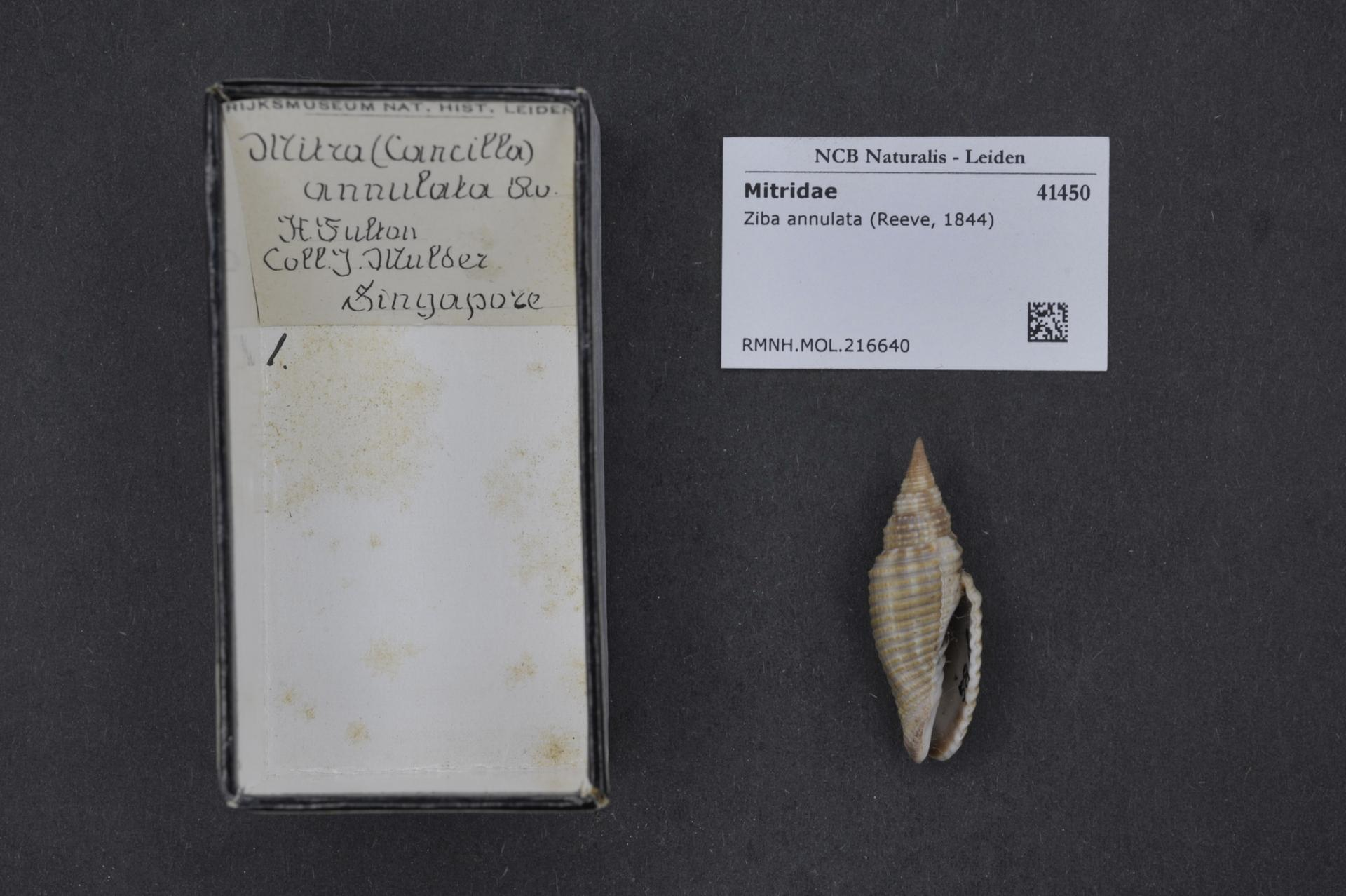
- Shell of Imbricaria annulata (specimen at Naturalis Biodiversity Center)

Scientific classification
- Kingdom: Animalia
- Phylum: Mollusca
- Class: Gastropoda
- Subclass: Caenogastropoda
- Order: Neogastropoda
- Family: Mitridae
- Genus: Imbricaria
- Species: I. annulata

Binomial name
- Imbricaria annulata (Reeve, 1844)

Synonyms
- Mitra (Cancilla) annulata Reeve, 1844; Mitra acutilirata Sowerby III, 1874; Mitra annulata Reeve, 1844 (original combination); Mitra marionae Melvill, J.C., 1888; Mitra nitens Kiener, L.C., 1838; Subcancilla annulata (Reeve, 1844); Ziba annulata (Reeve, 1844)

= Imbricaria annulata =

Species of gastropod

Imbricaria annulata, common name the ringed mitre, is a species of sea snail, a marine gastropod mollusk in the family Mitridae, the miters or miter snails.

== Description ==
The length of the shell varies between 8 mm and 35 mm.

The shell is subovate, pale rose, encircled with angular ridges, painted on the angles with interrupted red-brown lines. It is longitudinally striated between the ridges.

== Distribution ==
This marine species occurs in the Red Sea and in the Indian Ocean off Zanzibar down to Mozambique; off China and Japan; of the Marquesas
