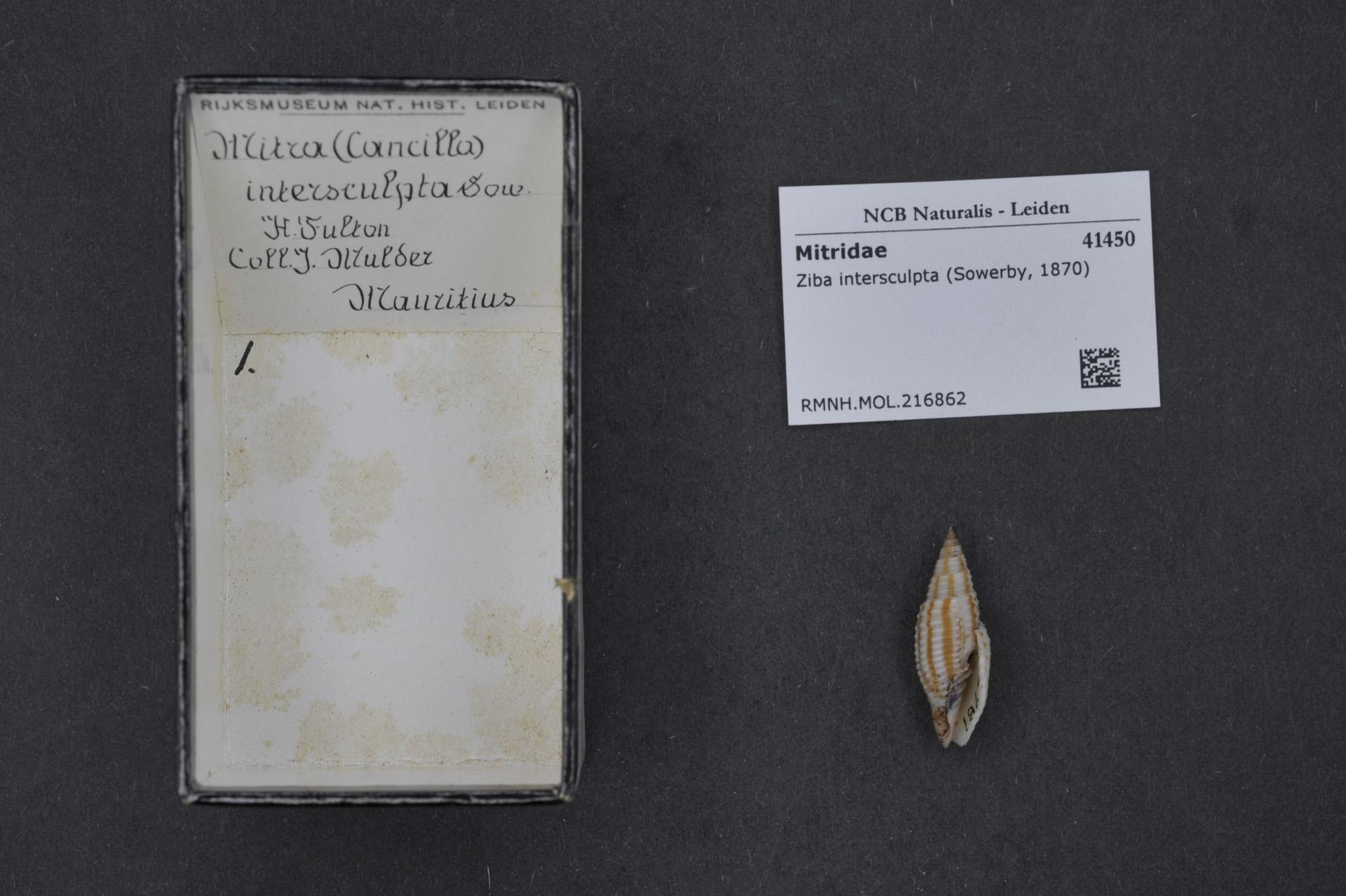
- Preserved specimen

Scientific classification
- Kingdom: Animalia
- Phylum: Mollusca
- Class: Gastropoda
- Subclass: Caenogastropoda
- Order: Neogastropoda
- Family: Mitridae
- Genus: Imbricaria
- Species: I. intersculpta

Binomial name
- Imbricaria intersculpta (Sowerby, 1870)

Synonyms
- Ziba intersculpta (Sowerby, 1870)

= Imbricaria intersculpta =

Species of gastropod

Imbricaria intersculpta is a species of sea snail, a marine gastropod mollusk in the family Mitridae, the miters or miter snails.
