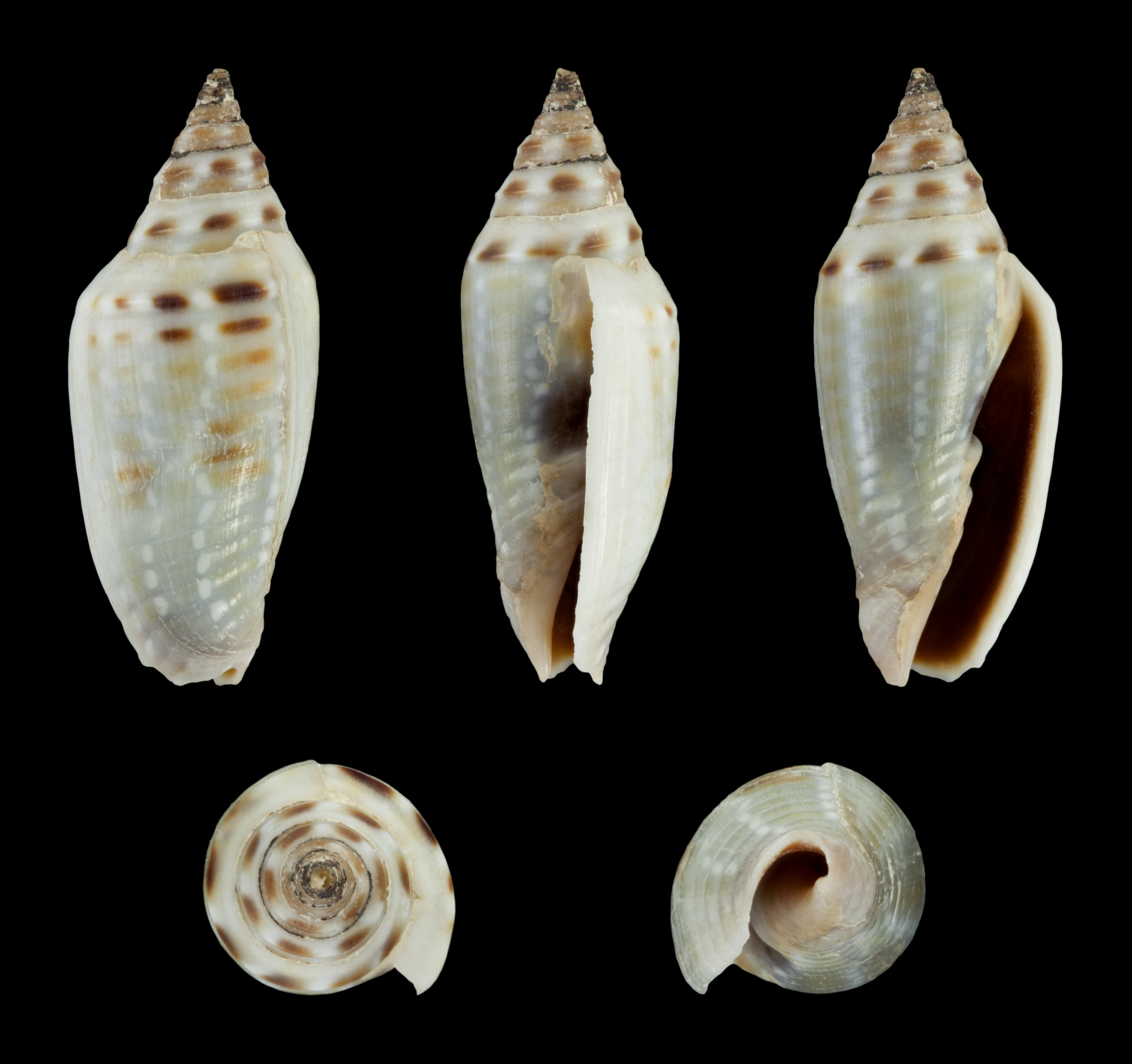

Scientific classification
- Kingdom: Animalia
- Phylum: Mollusca
- Class: Gastropoda
- Subclass: Caenogastropoda
- Order: Neogastropoda
- Family: Mitridae
- Genus: Imbricaria
- Species: I. astyagis

Binomial name
- Imbricaria astyagis (Dohrn, 1860)

Synonyms
- Mitra astyagis Dohrn, 1860; Ziba astyagis (Dohrn, 1860)

= Imbricaria astyagis =

Species of gastropod

Imbricaria astyagis is a species of sea snail, a marine gastropod mollusk in the family Mitridae, the miters or miter snails.

== Description ==
Shell size 25-30 mm.
