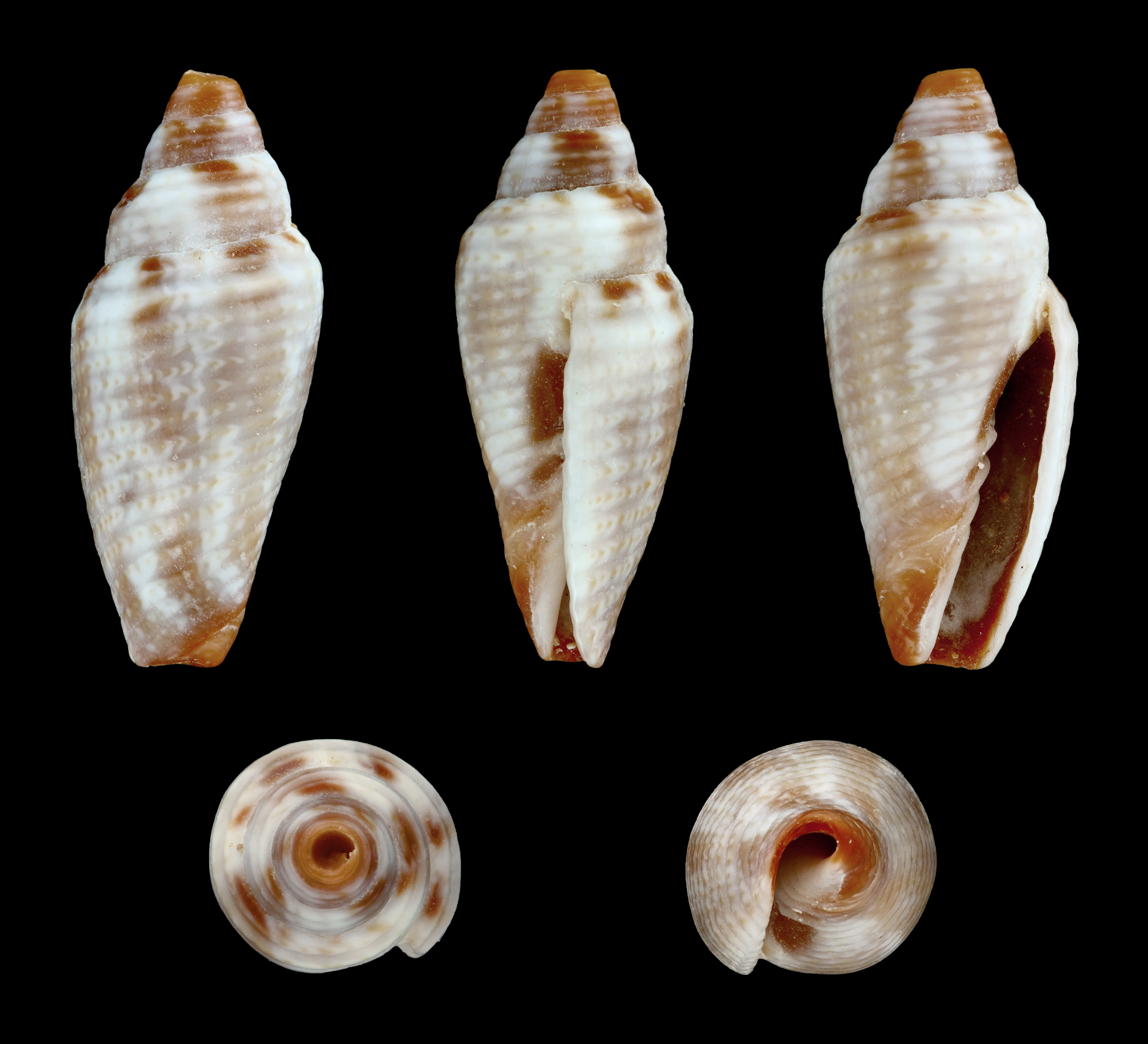

Scientific classification
- Kingdom: Animalia
- Phylum: Mollusca
- Class: Gastropoda
- Subclass: Caenogastropoda
- Order: Neogastropoda
- Family: Mitridae
- Genus: Imbricaria
- Species: I. bacillum

Binomial name
- Imbricaria bacillum (Lamarck, 1811)

Synonyms
- Cancilla philippinarum (A. Adams, 1853); Mitra baccillum Lamarck, 1811 (incorrect original spelling); Mitra bacillum Lamarck, 1811 (original combination); Mitra fischeri Souverbie, 1860; Mitra philippinarum A. Adams, 1853; Mitra strigillata G. B. Sowerby II, 1874; Ziba bacillum (Lamarck, 1811)

= Imbricaria bacillum =

Species of gastropod

Imbricaria bacillum, common name the Philippine mitre, is a species of sea snail, a marine gastropod mollusk in the family Mitridae, the miters or miter snails.

== Description ==
The length of the shell varies between 14 and 32.4 mm (0.55 and 1.28 in).

The shell is spirally grooved and longitudinally striped with greenish or bluish grey.

== Distribution ==
This marine species off the Andamans, the Philippines and off Samoa.
