= Imbricaria maui =

Scientific classification
- Kingdom: Animalia
- Phylum: Mollusca
- Class: Gastropoda
- Subclass: Caenogastropoda
- Order: Neogastropoda
- Family: Mitridae
- Genus: Imbricaria
- Species: I. maui

Binomial name
- Imbricaria maui (Kay, 1979)

Synonyms
- Ziba maui (Kay, 1979)

Species of gastropod

Imbricaria maui is a species of sea snail, a marine gastropod mollusk in the family Mitridae, the miters or miter snails.
