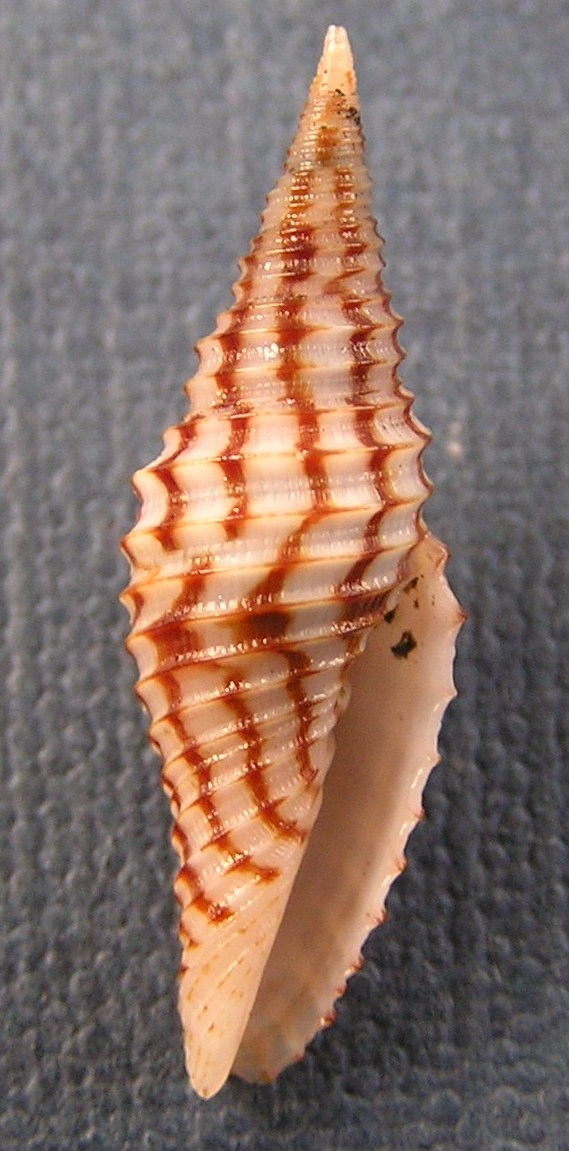

Scientific classification
- Kingdom: Animalia
- Phylum: Mollusca
- Class: Gastropoda
- Subclass: Caenogastropoda
- Order: Neogastropoda
- Family: Mitridae
- Genus: Imbricaria
- Species: I. hrdlickai

Binomial name
- Imbricaria hrdlickai (Salisbury, 1994)

Synonyms
- Subcancilla hrdlickai Salisbury, 1994 (original combination); Ziba hrdlickai (Salisbury, 1994)

= Imbricaria hrdlickai =

Species of gastropod

Imbricaria hrdlickai is a species of sea snail, a marine gastropod mollusk in the family Mitridae, the miters or miter snails.

== Description ==
The length of the shell varies between 12 mm and 30 mm.

== Distribution ==
This marine species occurs off the Philippines, New Guinea, and the Solomon Islands.
