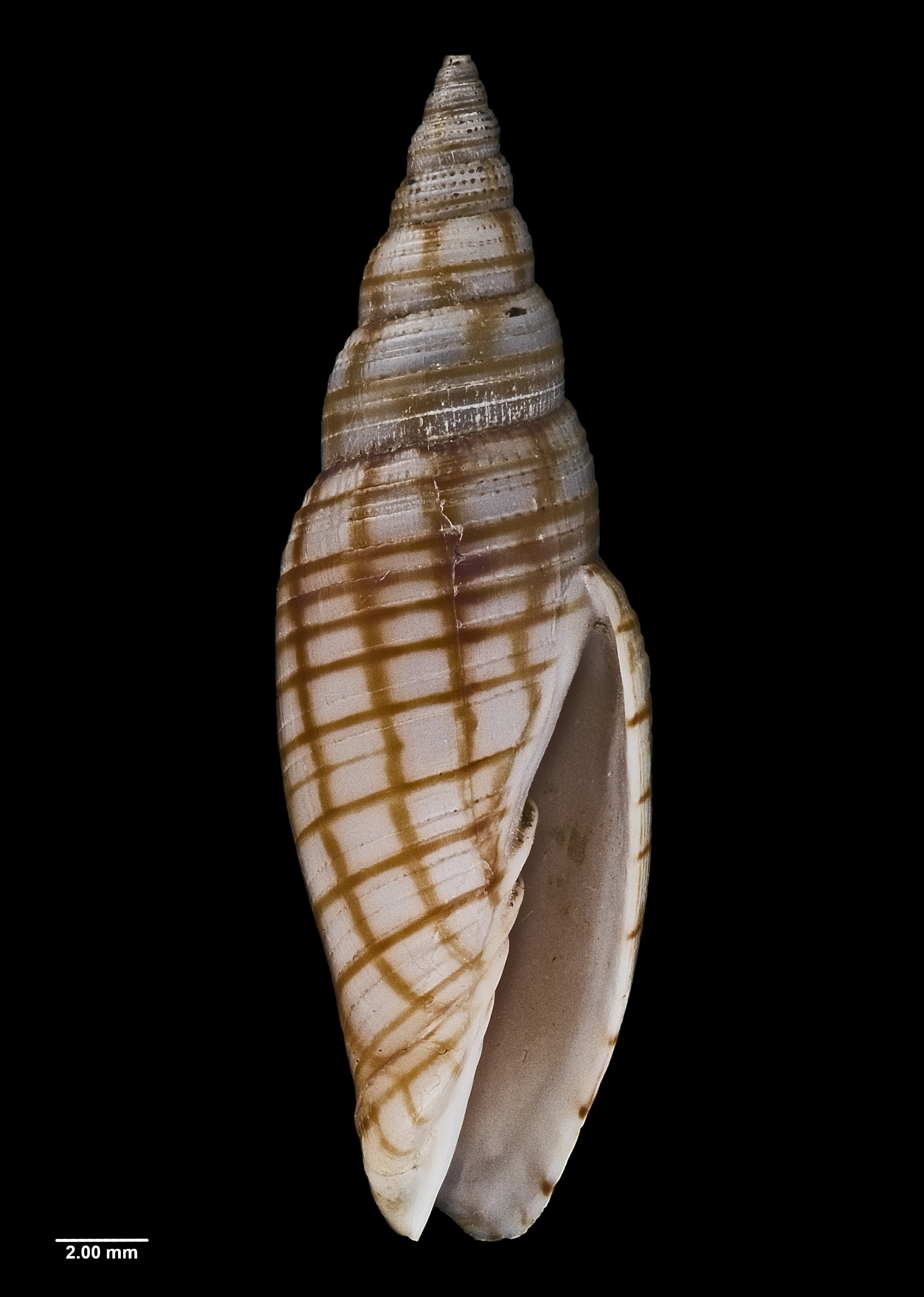
- Holotype

Scientific classification
- Kingdom: Animalia
- Phylum: Mollusca
- Class: Gastropoda
- Subclass: Caenogastropoda
- Order: Neogastropoda
- Family: Mitridae
- Genus: Imbricaria
- Species: I. cloveri

Binomial name
- Imbricaria cloveri (Cernohorsky, 1971)

Synonyms
- Cancilla (Ziba) cloveri Cernohorsky, 1971 (basionym); Cancilla cloveri Cernohorsky, 1971 (original combination); Swainsonia cloveri (Cernohorsky, 1971); Ziba cloveri (Cernohorsky, 1971)

= Imbricaria cloveri =

Species of gastropod

Imbricaria cloveri is a species of sea snail, a marine gastropod mollusk in the family Mitridae, the miters or miter snails.

== Description ==
The length of the shell varies between 13 mm and 35 mm.

== Distribution ==
This marine species occurs off the Philippines, Taiwan, Japan, and the Solomon Islands.
