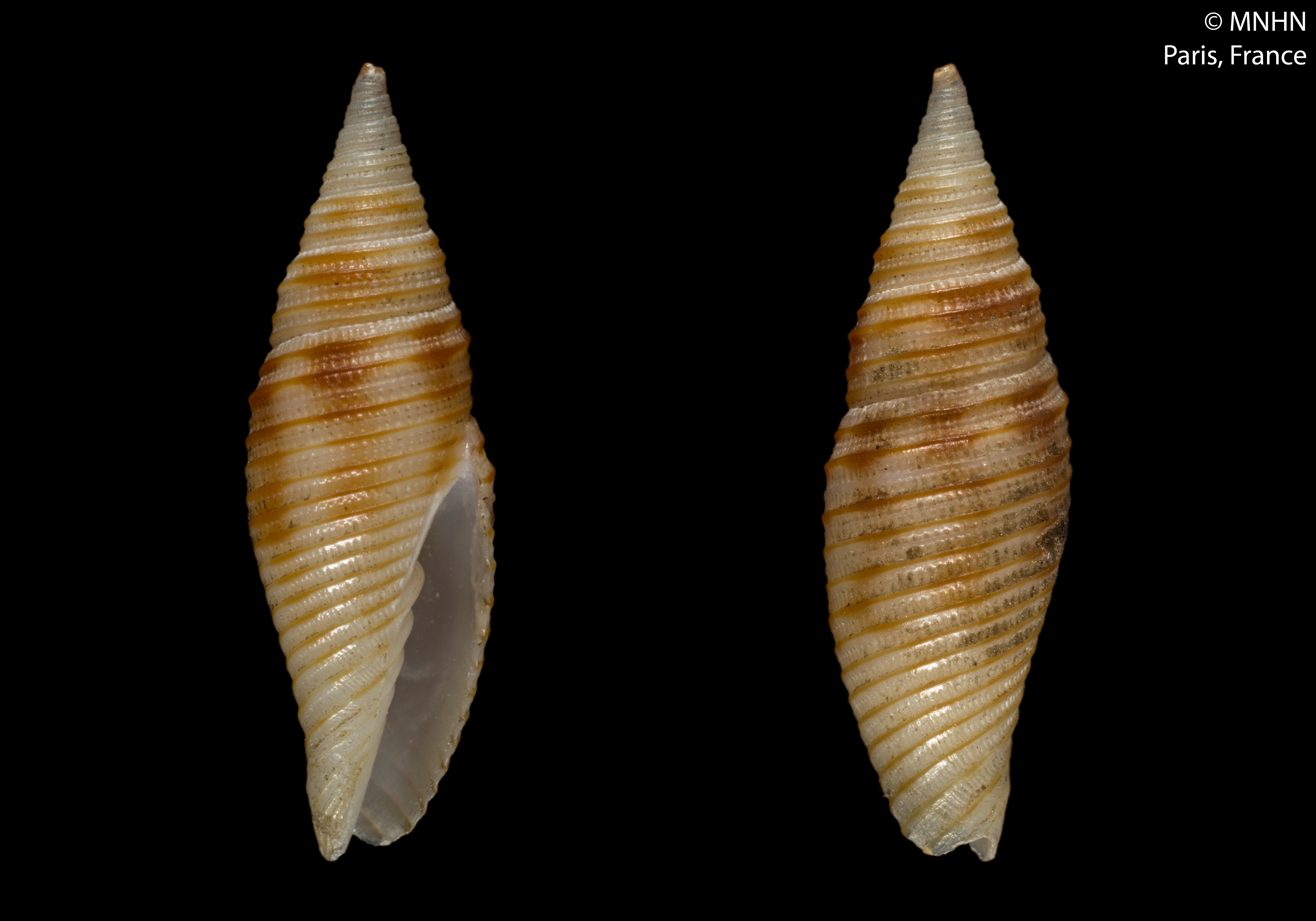
- Shell of Imbricaria salisburyi (holotype at MNHN? Paris)

Scientific classification
- Kingdom: Animalia
- Phylum: Mollusca
- Class: Gastropoda
- Subclass: Caenogastropoda
- Order: Neogastropoda
- Superfamily: Mitroidea
- Family: Mitridae
- Subfamily: Imbricariinae
- Genus: Imbricaria
- Species: I. salisburyi

Binomial name
- Imbricaria salisburyi (Drivas & Jay, 1990)

Synonyms
- Cancilla (Domiporta) salisburyi Drivas & Jay, 1990; Cancilla salisburyi Drivas & Jay, 1990; Subcancilla salisburyi (Drivas & Jay, 1990); Ziba salisburyi (Drivas & Jay, 1990)

= Imbricaria salisburyi =

Species of gastropod

Imbricaria salisburyi is a species of sea snail, a marine gastropod mollusk, in the family Mitridae, the miters or miter snails.

== Description ==
The length of the shell varies between 14 mm and 21 mm.

== Distribution ==
This marine species occurs off Réunion and the Philippines.
