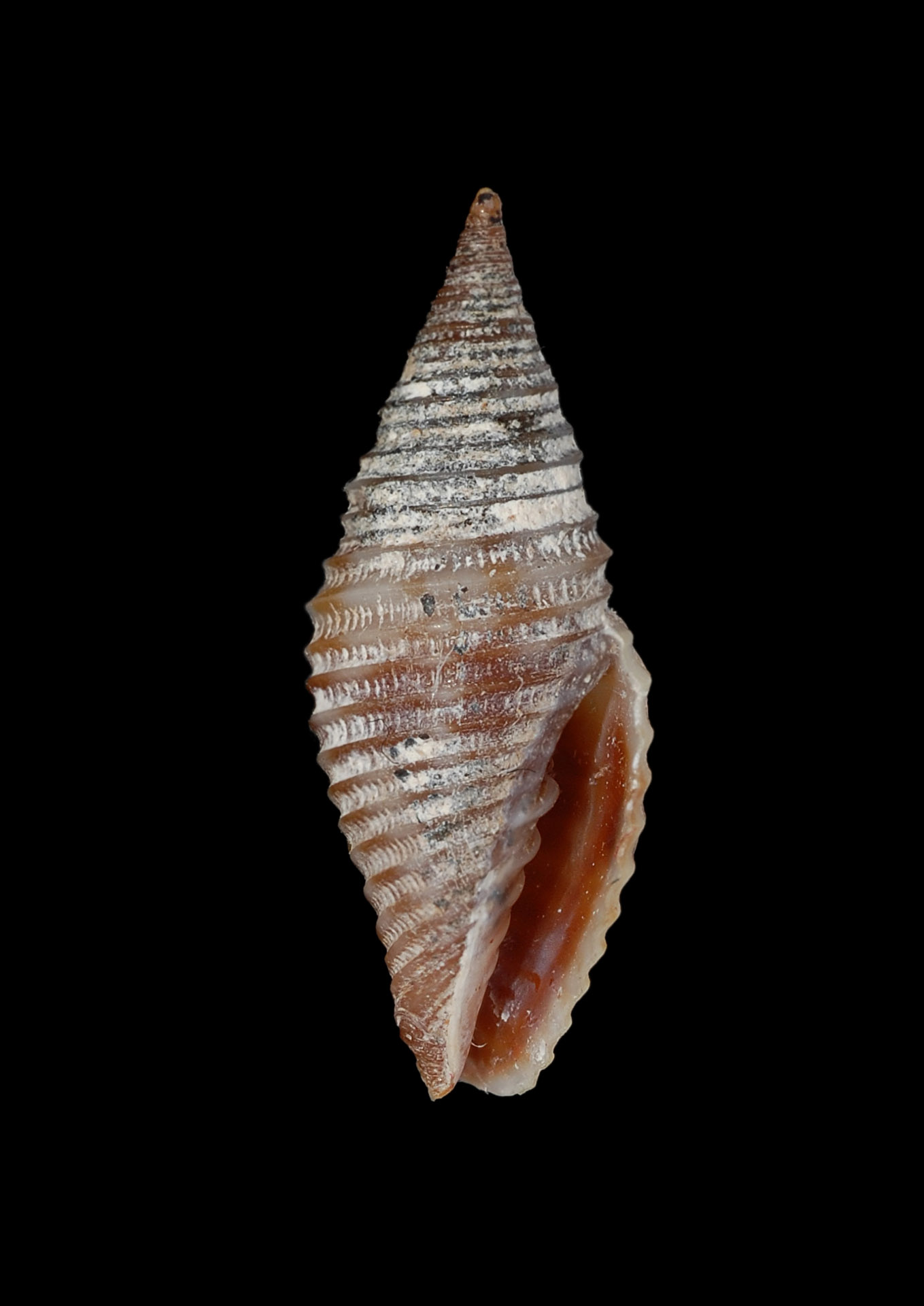
- Shell of Imbricaria flammigera (specimen at MNHN, Paris)

Scientific classification
- Kingdom: Animalia
- Phylum: Mollusca
- Class: Gastropoda
- Subclass: Caenogastropoda
- Order: Neogastropoda
- Superfamily: Mitroidea
- Family: Mitridae
- Subfamily: Imbricariinae
- Genus: Imbricaria
- Species: I. flammigera

Binomial name
- Imbricaria flammigera (Reeve, 1844)

Synonyms
- Mitra flammigera Reeve, 1844; Ziba flammigera (Reeve, 1844)

= Imbricaria flammigera =

Species of gastropod

Imbricaria flammigera is a species of sea snail, a marine gastropod mollusk, in the family Mitridae, the miters or miter snails.

== Distribution ==
This marine species occurs off Vietnam.
