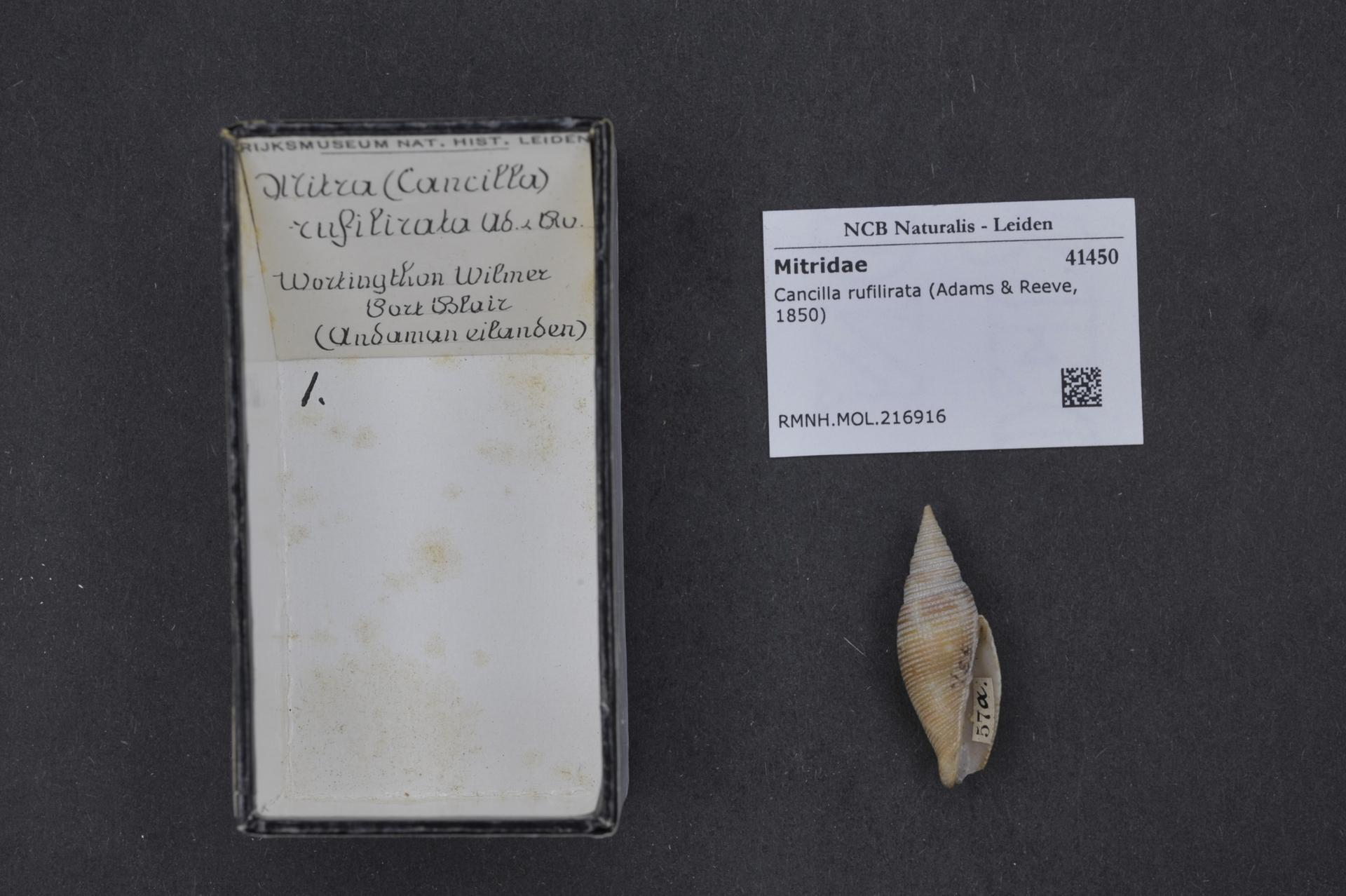
- Shell of Imbricaria rufilirata (specimen atNaturalis Biodiversity Center)

Scientific classification
- Kingdom: Animalia
- Phylum: Mollusca
- Class: Gastropoda
- Subclass: Caenogastropoda
- Order: Neogastropoda
- Family: Mitridae
- Genus: Imbricaria
- Species: I. rufilirata

Binomial name
- Imbricaria rufilirata (Adams & Reeve, 1850)

Synonyms
- Cancilla (Domiporta) rufilirata (Adams & Reeve, 1850); Cancilla rufilirata (Adams & Reeve, 1850); Domiporta rufilirata (Adams & Reeve, 1850); Mitra rufilirata Adams & Reeve, 1850 (original combination)

= Imbricaria rufilirata =

Species of gastropod

Imbricaria rufilirata is a species of sea snail, a marine gastropod mollusk in the family Mitridae, the miters or miter snails.

== Distribution ==
This species occurs in the Indian Ocean off the Mascarene Basin.
