= Imbricaria polycincta =

Scientific classification
- Kingdom: Animalia
- Phylum: Mollusca
- Class: Gastropoda
- Subclass: Caenogastropoda
- Order: Neogastropoda
- Family: Mitridae
- Genus: Imbricaria
- Species: I. polycincta

Binomial name
- Imbricaria polycincta (Turner, 2007)

Synonyms
- Domiporta polycincta Turner, 2007

Species of gastropod

Imbricaria polycincta is a species of sea snail, a marine gastropod mollusc in the family Mitridae, the miters or miter snails.
