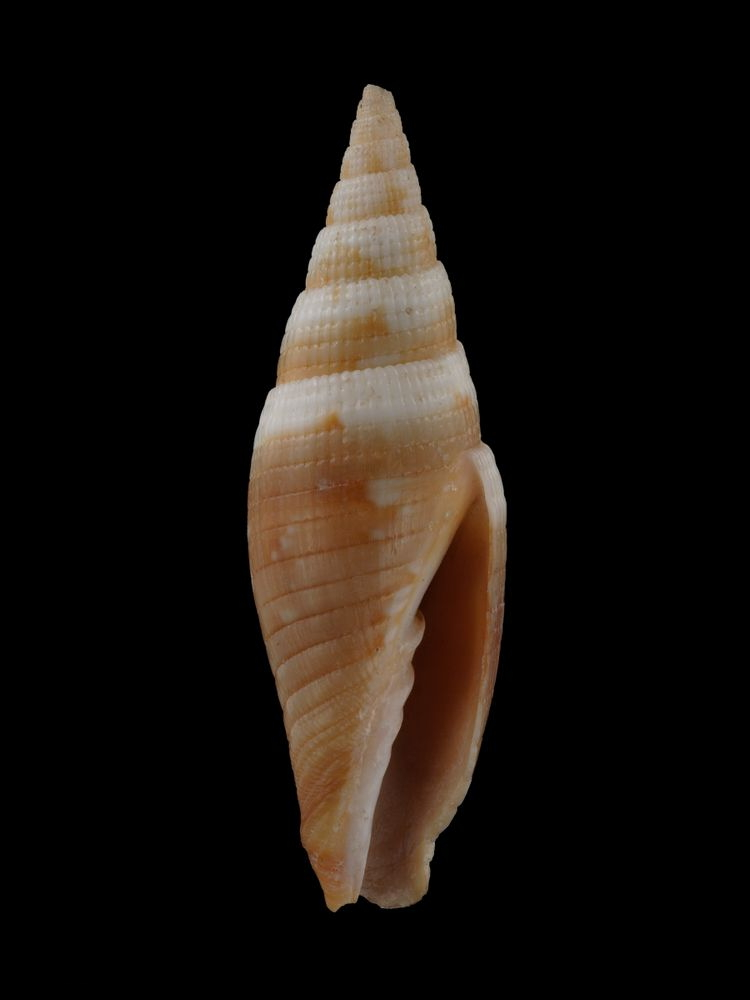
- Shell of Imbricaria kermadecensis (specimen at the Museum of New Zealand)

Scientific classification
- Kingdom: Animalia
- Phylum: Mollusca
- Class: Gastropoda
- Subclass: Caenogastropoda
- Order: Neogastropoda
- Family: Mitridae
- Genus: Imbricaria
- Species: I. kermadecensis

Binomial name
- Imbricaria kermadecensis Cernohorsky, 1978

Synonyms
- Ziba kermadecensis Cernohorsky, 1978

= Imbricaria kermadecensis =

Species of gastropod

Imbricaria kermadecensis is a species of sea snail, a marine gastropod mollusk in the family Mitridae, the miters or miter snails.

== Distribution ==
This marine species occurs off New Caledonia and New Zealand.
