= Imbricaria amoena =

Scientific classification
- Kingdom: Animalia
- Phylum: Mollusca
- Class: Gastropoda
- Subclass: Caenogastropoda
- Order: Neogastropoda
- Superfamily: Mitroidea
- Family: Mitridae
- Subfamily: Imbricariinae
- Genus: Imbricaria
- Species: I. amoena

Binomial name
- Imbricaria amoena (A. Adams, 1853)

Synonyms
- Mitra amoena A. Adams, 1853; Subcancilla amoena (A. Adams, 1853); Ziba amoena (A. Adams, 1853)

Species of sea snail

Imbricaria amoena is a species of sea snail, a marine gastropod mollusk, in the family Mitridae, the miters or miter snails.
