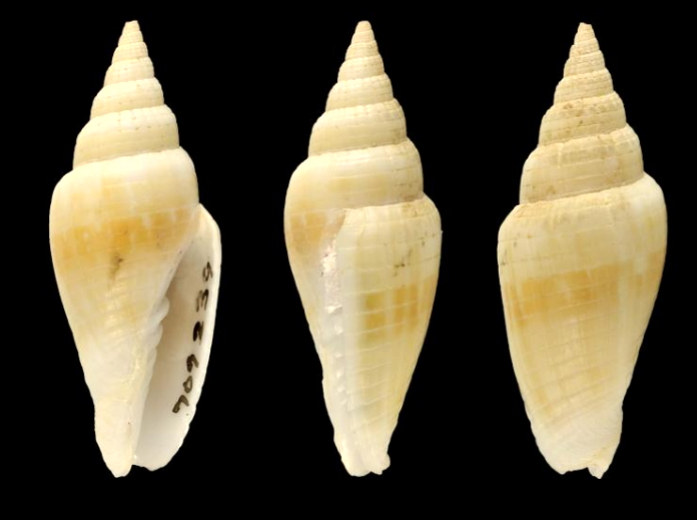
- Shell of Imbricaria cernohorskyi (holotype at the Smithsonian Institution)

Scientific classification
- Kingdom: Animalia
- Phylum: Mollusca
- Class: Gastropoda
- Subclass: Caenogastropoda
- Order: Neogastropoda
- Family: Mitridae
- Genus: Imbricaria
- Species: I. cernohorskyi

Binomial name
- Imbricaria cernohorskyi (Rehder & Wilson, 1975)

Synonyms
- Cancilla (Ziba) cernohorskyi (Rehder & B. R. Wilson, 1975); Mitra cernohorskyi (Rehder & B. R. Wilson, 1975) ·; Ziba cernohorskyi Rehder & Wilson, 1975

= Imbricaria cernohorskyi =

Species of gastropod

Imbricaria cernohorskyi is a species of sea snail, a marine gastropod mollusk in the family Mitridae, the miters or miter snails.

== Description ==
Shell size 35-40 mm.

== Distribution ==
This marine species occurs off Pitcairn and Kermadec Islands.
