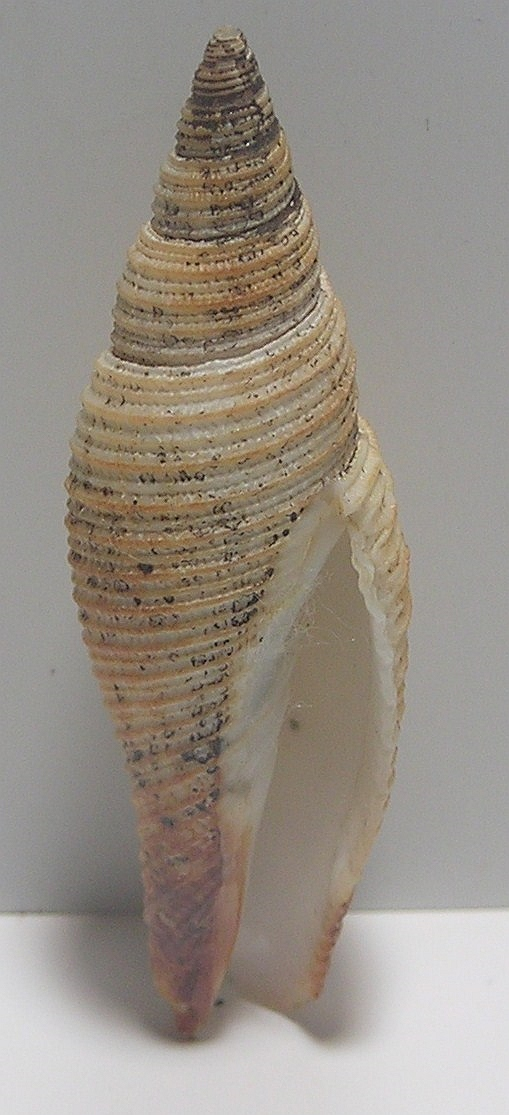

Scientific classification
- Kingdom: Animalia
- Phylum: Mollusca
- Class: Gastropoda
- Subclass: Caenogastropoda
- Order: Neogastropoda
- Family: Mitridae
- Genus: Imbricaria
- Species: I. interlirata

Binomial name
- Imbricaria interlirata (Reeve, 1844)

Synonyms
- Cancilla interlirata (Reeve, 1844); Mitra interlirata Reeve, 1844; Scabricola interlirata (Reeve, 1844); Subcancilla interlirata (Reeve, 1844); Ziba interlirata (Reeve, 1844)

= Imbricaria interlirata =

Species of gastropod

Imbricaria interlirata, common name the interlyrate mitre, is a species of sea snail, a marine gastropod mollusk in the family Mitridae, the miters or miter snails.

== Description ==
The length of the shell varies between 29 mm and 57 mm.

== Distribution ==
This marine species occurs in the Indo-West Pacific and off New Guinea and Fiji.
