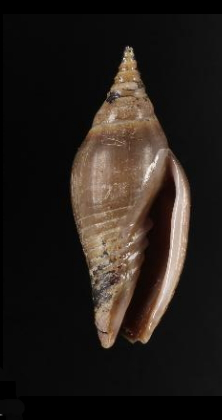
- Shell of Imbricaria bantamensis (specimen at MNHN, Paris)

Scientific classification
- Kingdom: Animalia
- Phylum: Mollusca
- Class: Gastropoda
- Subclass: Caenogastropoda
- Order: Neogastropoda
- Family: Mitridae
- Genus: Imbricaria
- Species: I. bantamensis

Binomial name
- Imbricaria bantamensis (Oostingh, 1939)

Synonyms
- Mitra bantamensis Oostingh, 1939; Ziba bantamensis (Oostingh, 1939)

= Imbricaria bantamensis =

Species of gastropod

Imbricaria bantamensis is a species of sea snail, a marine gastropod mollusk in the family Mitridae, the miters or miter snails.
