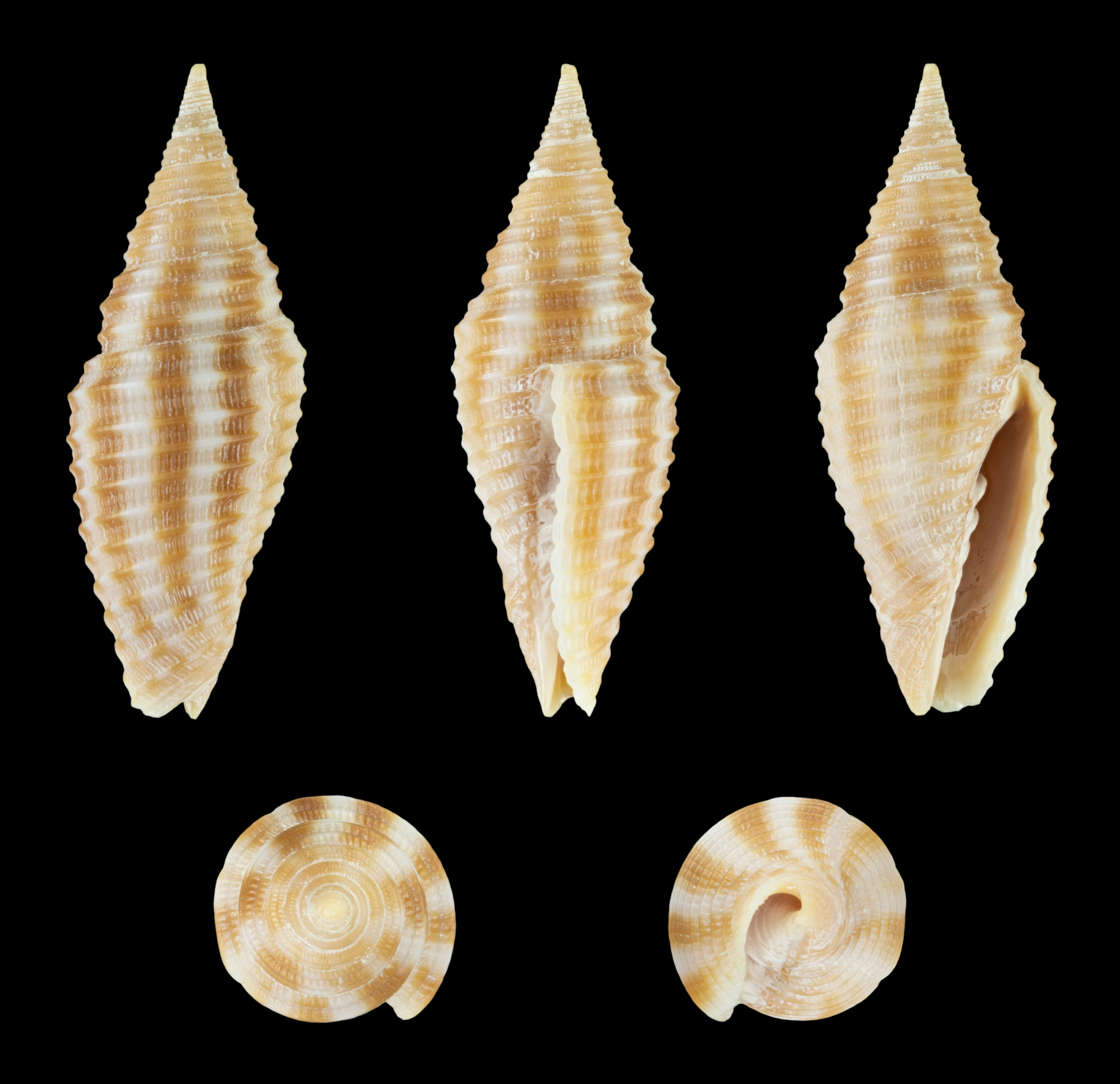

Scientific classification
- Kingdom: Animalia
- Phylum: Mollusca
- Class: Gastropoda
- Subclass: Caenogastropoda
- Order: Neogastropoda
- Family: Mitridae
- Genus: Imbricaria
- Species: I. flammea

Binomial name
- Imbricaria flammea (Quoy & Gaimard, 1833)

Synonyms
- Mitra flammigera Reeve, 1844; Mitra interlirata Reeve, 1844; Subcancilla flammea (Quoy & Gaimard, 1833); Ziba flammea (Quoy & Gaimard, 1833)

= Imbricaria flammea =

Species of gastropod

Imbricaria flammea is a species of sea snail, a marine gastropod mollusk in the family Mitridae, the miters or miter snails.

== Description ==
The shell size varies between 10 mm and 34 mm.

== Distribution ==
This species is distributed in the Red Sea and in the Indian Ocean along Madagascar and Mauritius; Indo-West Pacific.
