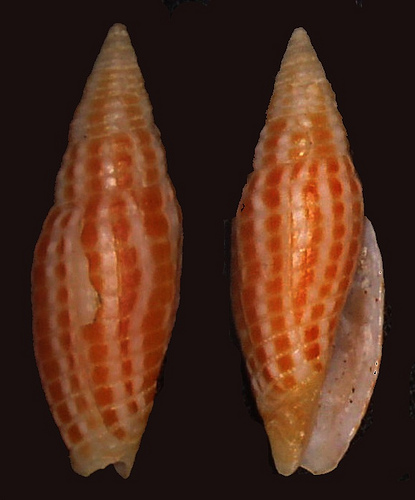
- Shell of Imbricaria fulgetrum

Scientific classification
- Kingdom: Animalia
- Phylum: Mollusca
- Class: Gastropoda
- Subclass: Caenogastropoda
- Order: Neogastropoda
- Family: Mitridae
- Genus: Imbricaria
- Species: I. fulgetrum

Binomial name
- Imbricaria fulgetrum (Reeve, 1844)

Synonyms
- Mitra boissaci Montrouzier, R.P., 1859; Mitra cyri Dohrn, H., 1860; Mitra fulgetrum Reeve, 1844; Ziba fulgetrum (Reeve, 1844)

= Imbricaria fulgetrum =

Species of gastropod

Imbricaria fulgetrum is a species of sea snail, a marine gastropod mollusk in the family Mitridae, the miters or miter snails.

== Description ==
The Imbricaria fulgetrum belongs to the largest class under phylum Mollusca, Gastropod. Gastropods are unique among molluscs for their ability to inhabit a wide range of habitats, including terrestrial, marine and freshwater, however, the Imbricaria fulgetrum is mostly marine. A dominant characteristic of a mollusc is often, its coiled shell. The Imbricaria fulgetrum's shell size varies between 15 mm and 28 mm and is elongated, with intricate patterns, which is typical of miter snails.

They are often predaceous, and feed on small invertebrates using specialized siphons and radulae. it thus helps in controlling benthic populations.

Molecular studies show Mitridae underwent major reclassification in 2018 (“collapse of Mitra”), indicating their evolutionary relationships are still being clarified.

It has no known medical uses, and research is limited because it's not commercially or pharmacologically significant.

== Distribution ==
This marine species occurs in the Western Pacific Ocean off Papua New Guinea, Solomons Islands and Fiji.
