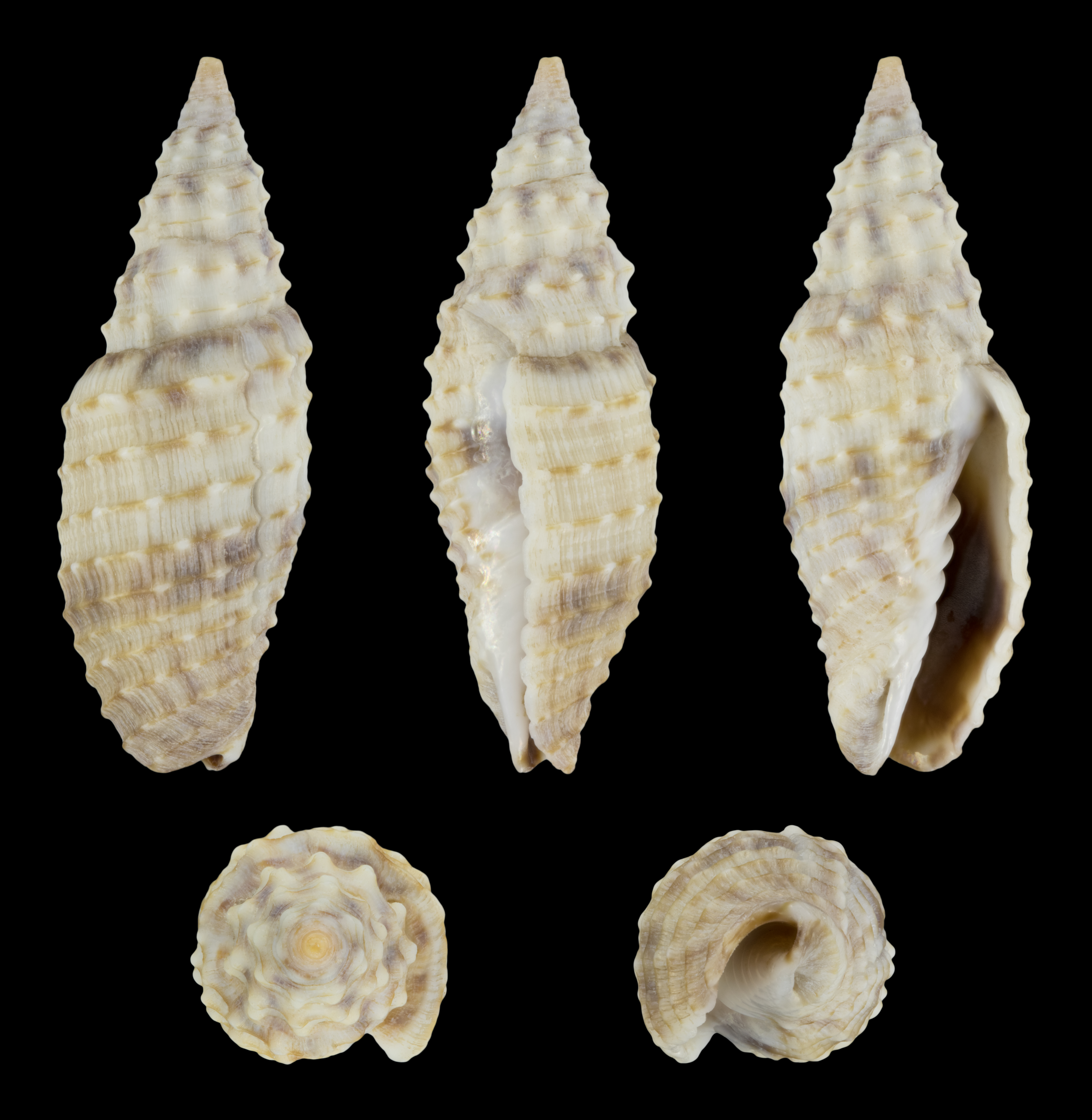

Scientific classification
- Kingdom: Animalia
- Phylum: Mollusca
- Class: Gastropoda
- Subclass: Caenogastropoda
- Order: Neogastropoda
- Family: Mitridae
- Genus: Imbricaria
- Species: I. verrucosa

Binomial name
- Imbricaria verrucosa (Reeve, 1845)

Synonyms
- Ziba verrucosa (Reeve, 1845)

= Imbricaria verrucosa =

Species of gastropod

Imbricaria verrucosa is a species of sea snail, a marine gastropod mollusc in the family Mitridae, the miters or miter snails.
