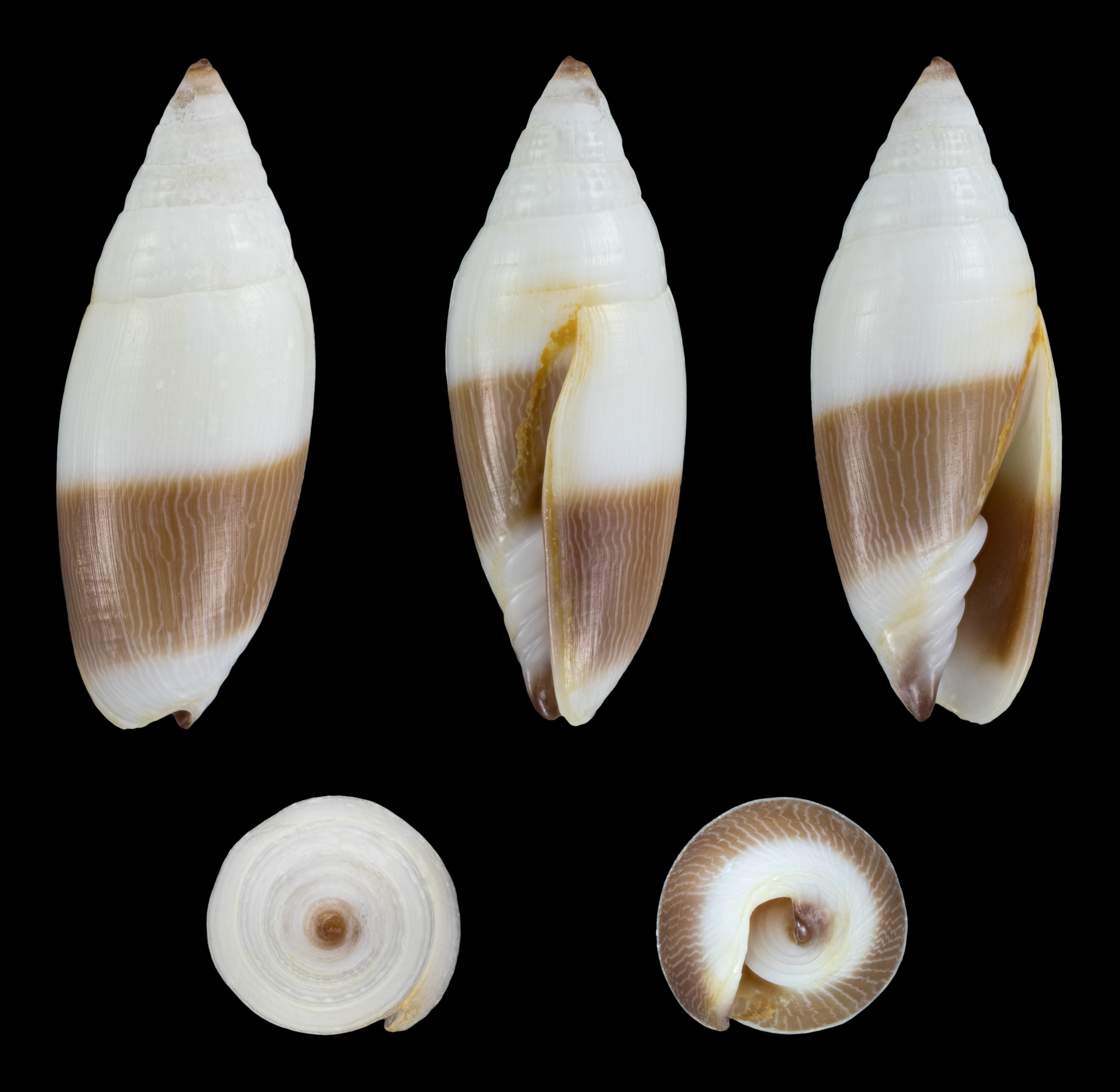

Scientific classification
- Kingdom: Animalia
- Phylum: Mollusca
- Class: Gastropoda
- Subclass: Caenogastropoda
- Order: Neogastropoda
- Family: Mitridae
- Genus: Scabricola
- Species: S. bicolor

Binomial name
- Scabricola bicolor (Swainson, 1824)

Synonyms
- Imbricaria bicolor (Swainson, 1824); Imbricaria filum Wood, 1828; Mitra bicolor Swainson, 1824; Swainsonia bicolor (Swainson, 1824)

= Scabricola bicolor =

Species of gastropod

Scabricola bicolor is a species of sea snail, a marine gastropod mollusk in the family Mitridae, the miters or miter snails.

== Description ==
The species was first described by William Swainson under the name Mitra bicolor. The shell is smooth, polished, fusiform, white, with a brown central band. It seldom exceeds three-quarters of an inch in length.

== Distribution ==
This marine species occurs off East Africa; in the Indian Ocean off Madagascar; Mauritius; Comoros; Seychelles
