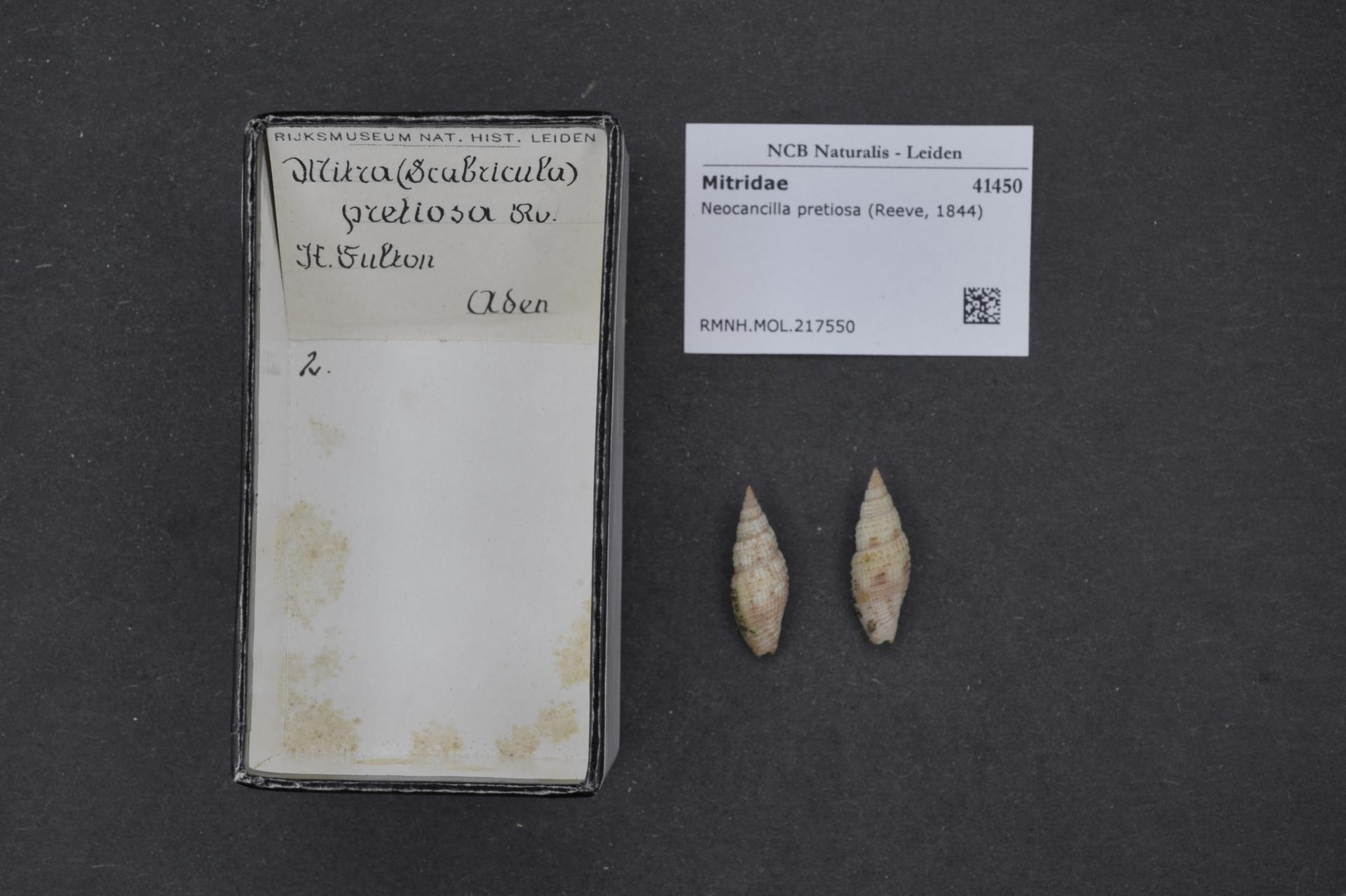

Scientific classification
- Kingdom: Animalia
- Phylum: Mollusca
- Class: Gastropoda
- Subclass: Caenogastropoda
- Order: Neogastropoda
- Family: Mitridae
- Genus: Imbricaria
- Species: I. pretiosa

Binomial name
- Imbricaria pretiosa (Reeve, 1844)

Synonyms
- Cancilla antoniae Adams, H.G., 1870; Mitra pretiosa Reeve, 1844; Neocancilla pretiosa (Reeve, 1844); Ziba pretiosa (Reeve, 1844)

= Imbricaria pretiosa =

Species of gastropod

Imbricaria pretiosa, common name the splendid mitre, is a species of sea snail, a marine gastropod mollusk in the family Mitridae, the miters or miter snails.

== Description ==
The length of the shell varies between 15 mm and 40 mm.

== Distribution ==
This marine species occurs in the Red Sea and off East Africa; in the Eastern Indian Ocean; and off Fiji.
