= Gemmulimitra duplilirata =

Scientific classification
- Kingdom: Animalia
- Phylum: Mollusca
- Class: Gastropoda
- Subclass: Caenogastropoda
- Order: Neogastropoda
- Family: Mitridae
- Genus: Gemmulimitra
- Species: G. duplilirata

Binomial name
- Gemmulimitra duplilirata (Reeve, 1845)

Synonyms
- Cancilla astenostomoides Nomura, S., 1935; Cancilla duplilirata (Reeve, 1845); Cancilla lalage Melvill, J.C. & R. Standen, 1901; Mitra duplilirata Reeve, 1845 (original combination); Scabricola juttinga Koperberg, 1931; Subcancilla juttingae (Koperberg, 1931); Ziba duplilirata (Reeve, 1845)

Species of gastropod

Gemmulimitra duplilirata is a species of sea snail, a marine gastropod mollusk in the family Mitridae, the miters or miter snails.

== Description ==
The length of the shell varies between 10 mm and 35 mm.

== Distribution ==
This marine species occurs in the Gulf of Oman to the South China Sea; off Northeast Australia
