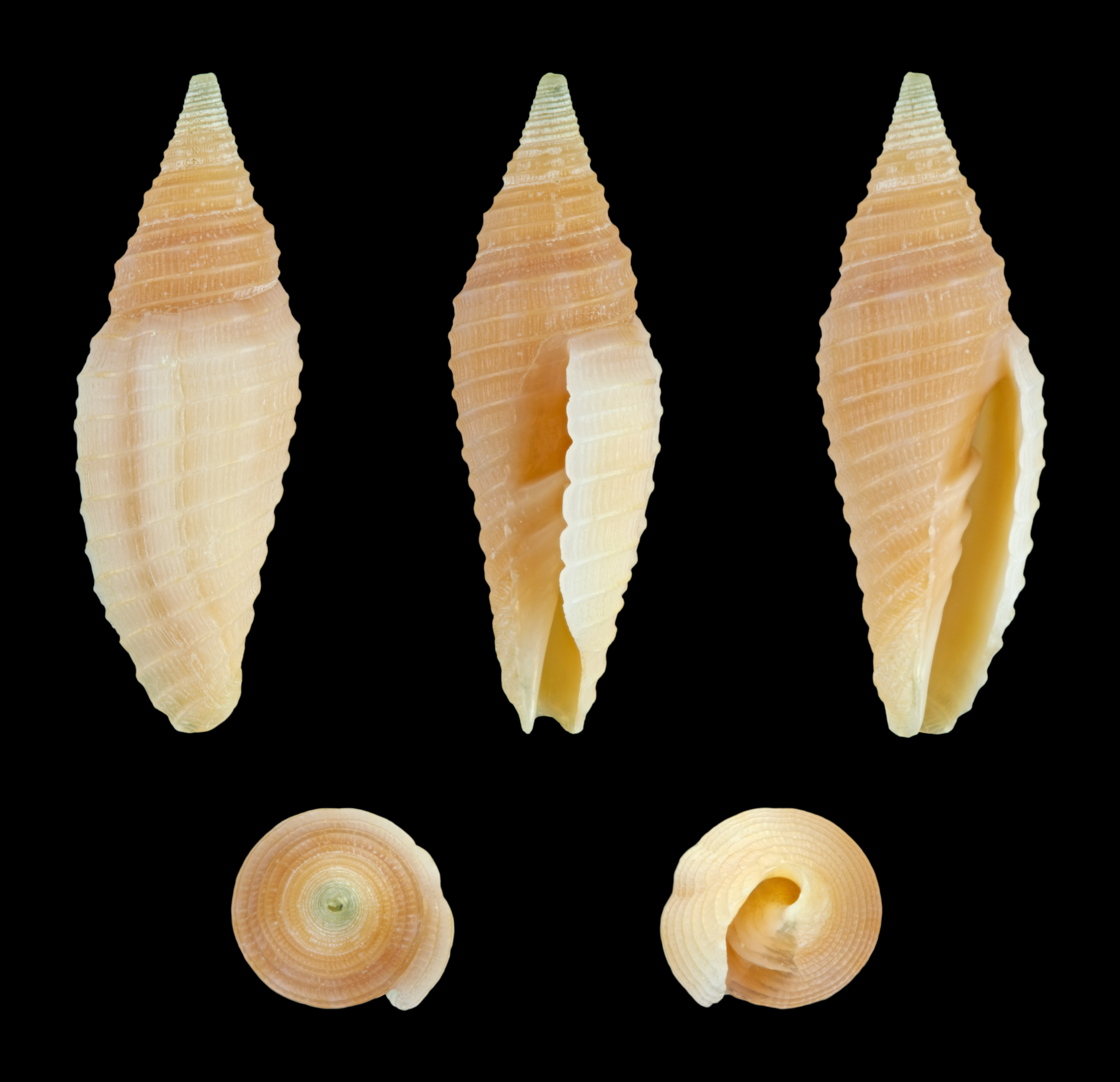

Scientific classification
- Kingdom: Animalia
- Phylum: Mollusca
- Class: Gastropoda
- Subclass: Caenogastropoda
- Order: Neogastropoda
- Family: Mitridae
- Genus: Imbricaria
- Species: I. insculpta

Binomial name
- Imbricaria insculpta (A. Adams, 1851)

Synonyms
- Mitra intersculpta G. B. Sowerby II, 1870 (original combination); Ziba insculpta (A. Adams, 1851)

= Imbricaria insculpta =

Species of gastropod

Imbricaria insculpta is a species of sea snail, a marine gastropod mollusk in the family Mitridae, the miters or miter snails.

== Description ==
The length of the shell varies between 16 mm and 28 mm.

== Distribution ==
This marine species occurs in the Indo-West Pacific and off Vietnam and the Philippines.
