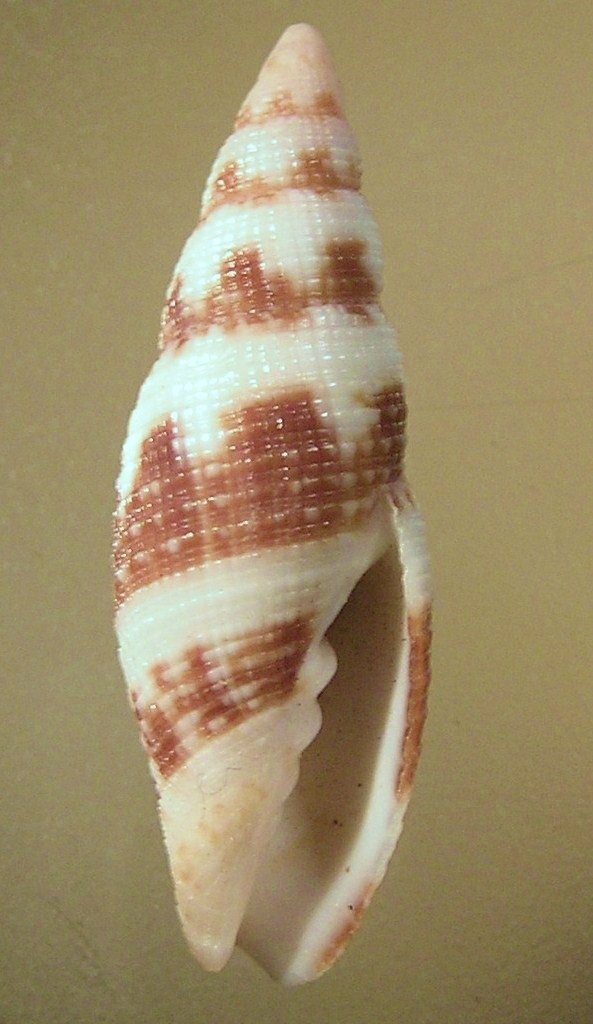
- Neocancilla clathrus

Scientific classification
- Kingdom: Animalia
- Phylum: Mollusca
- Class: Gastropoda
- Subclass: Caenogastropoda
- Order: Neogastropoda
- Superfamily: Mitroidea
- Family: Mitridae
- Subfamily: Imbricariinae
- Genus: Neocancilla; Cernohorsky, 1966

Type species
- Neocancilla papilio papilio Link, H.F., 1807

Synonyms
- Mitra (Neocancilla) Cernohorsky, 1970

= Neocancilla =

Genus of gastropods

Neocancilla is a genus of sea snails, marine gastropod mollusks in the subfamily Imbricariinae of the family Mitridae.

== Species ==
Species within the genus Neocancilla include:

- Neocancilla antoniae (H. Adams, 1871)
- Neocancilla arenacea (Dunker, 1852)
- Neocancilla clathrus (Gmelin, 1791)
- Neocancilla hartorum Poppe, Salisbury & Tagaro, 2015
- Neocancilla hemmenae Salisbury & Heinicke, 1993
- Neocancilla kayae Cernohorsky, 1978
- Neocancilla maculosa (Gmelin, 1791)
- Neocancilla madagascariensis Herrmann, 2017
- Neocancilla papilio (Link, 1807)
- Neocancilla rufescens (A. Adams, 1853)
- Neocancilla takiisaoi (Kuroda, 1969)
- Neocancilla waikikiensis (Pilsbry, 1921)

Species brought into synonymy

- Neocancilla aliciae (Poppe, Tagaro & R. Salisbury, 2009): synonym of Gemmulimitra aliciae (Poppe, Tagaro & R. Salisbury, 2009)
- Neocancilla armonica (T. Cossignani & V. Cossignani, 2005): synonym of Imbricaria armonica (T. Cossignani & V. Cossignani, 2005)
- Neocancilla baeri H. Turner & Cernohorsky, 2003: synonym of Cancilla baeri (H. Turner & Cernohorsky, 2003) (original combination)
- Neocancilla carnicolor (Reeve, 1844): synonym of Domiporta carnicolor (Reeve, 1844)
- Neocancilla circula (Kiener, 1838): synonym of Domiporta circula (Kiener, 1838)
- Neocancilla condei (Guillot de Suduiraut, 2001): synonym of Scabricola condei Guillot de Suduiraut, 2001
- Neocancilla coriacea (Reeve, 1845): synonym of Scabricola coriacea (Reeve, 1845)
- Neocancilla daidaleosa B.-Q. Li & X.-Z. Li, 2005: synonym of Domiporta daidaleosa (B.-Q. Li & X.-Z. Li, 2005) (original combination)
- Neocancilla gloriola (Cernohorsky, 1970): synonym of Domiporta gloriola (Cernohorsky, 1970)
- Neocancilla granatina (Lamarck, 1811): synonym of Domiporta granatina (Lamarck, 1811)
- Neocancilla hebes (Reeve, 1845): synonym of Domiporta hebes (Reeve, 1845)
- Neocancilla latistriata Herrmann & R. Salisbury, 2012: synonym of Domiporta latistriata (Herrmann & R. Salisbury, 2012) (original combination)
- Neocancilla lavoisieri (Guillot de Suduiraut, 2002): synonym of Scabricola lavoisieri Guillot de Suduiraut, 2002
- Neocancilla pretiosa (Reeve, 1844): synonym of Imbricaria pretiosa (Reeve, 1844)
- Neocancilla rikae Guillot de Suduiraut, 2004: synonym of Cancilla rikae (Guillot de Suduiraut, 2004) (original combination)
- Neocancilla splendidula (R. Salisbury & Guillot de Suduiraut, 2003): synonym of Scabricola splendidula R. Salisbury & Guillot de Suduiraut, 2003
- Neocancilla vicdani (Cernohorsky, 1981): synonym of Scabricola vicdani Cernohorsky, 1981
