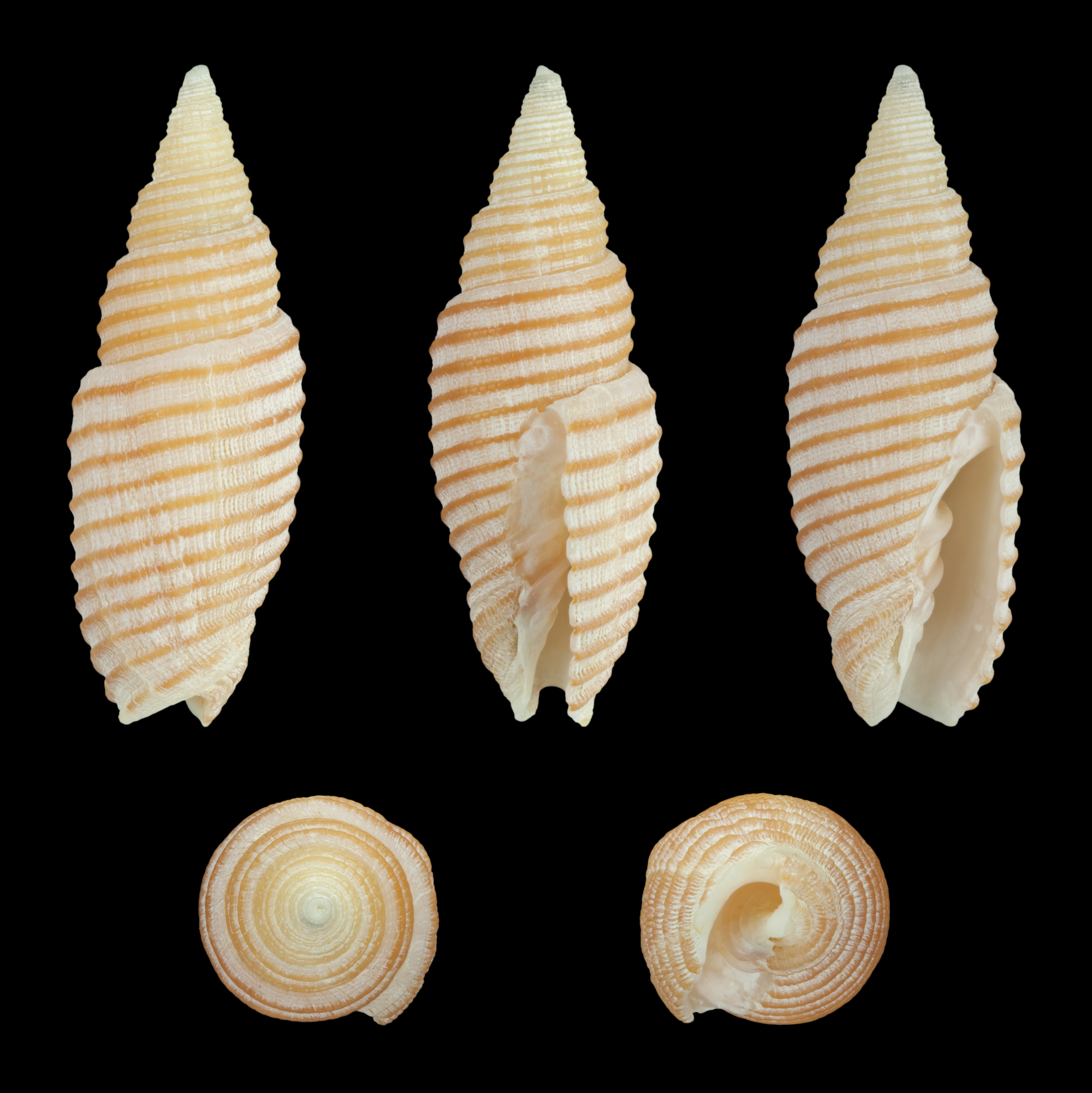
- Shell of Domiporta filaris

Scientific classification
- Kingdom: Animalia
- Phylum: Mollusca
- Class: Gastropoda
- Subclass: Caenogastropoda
- Order: Neogastropoda
- Family: Mitridae
- Subfamily: Mitrinae
- Genus: Domiporta; Cernohorsky, 1970

Type species
- Voluta filaris Linnaeus, 1771

Synonyms
- Cancilla (Domiporta) Cernohorsky, 1970

= Domiporta =

Genus of gastropods

Domiporta is a genus of sea snails, marine gastropod mollusks in the family Mitridae. First described in 1970 by Walter Oliver Cernohorsky, the genus is typically found in shallow to bathypelagic waters in the Indo-Pacific. Domiporta can be identified due to their distinctive radula.

== Description ==
Members of Domiporta have a shell ranging between 15–65 mm (0.59–2.56 in) in size, and are fusiform, either elongated or ovate. They have a high spire, short aprtture, teleochonches that have been 5-10 convex whorls, a protoconch that has 1.5-4 smooth nuclear whorls, which range in colour between white, violet or translucent. The radula of Comiporta is uniquely patterned.

== Taxonomy ==
The taxon was first described as a subgenus of Cancilla in 1970 by New Zealand malacologist Walter Oliver Cernohorsky, who assigned Domiporta filaris, which has originally been described as Voluta filaris by Carl Linnaeus in 1771, as the type species. Domiporta was first identified as "group 10" by Alfred Hands Cooke in 1920, who noticed similarities between the species due to their unique radula. Both Alfred James Peile in 1936 and Cernohorsky in 1966 recognised the distinctiveness of Domiporta, but it was not until 1970 when Cernohorsky formally described Domiporta as a taxon. By 1977, Cernohorsky had begun to describe Domiporta as a genus, and in 1989, Domiporta was described as a genus by Vaught, Abbott and Boss.

Phylogenetic analysis places Domiporta in the core of the Mitridae family group in Clade M-II, with the closest relatives being members of the genera Roseomitra, Fusidomiporta and Profundimitra, with more distant relatives including Quasimitra, Pseudonebularia and Ziba.

== Distribution ==
Domiporta are found in tropical Indo-Pacific regions, South Africa, southeastern Australia and the Kermadec Islands, and potentially West Africa. Fossils of the group date back to at least the Miocene.

== Ecology ==
Domiporta tend to live in shallow subtidal water, with some members living in the bathypelagic zone.

== Species ==
Species within the genus Domiporta include:

- Domiporta aglais (B. Q. Li & S. P. Zhang, 2005)
- Domiporta carnicolor (Reeve, 1844)
- Domiporta circula (Kiener, 1838)
- Domiporta daidaleosa (B. Q. Li & X. Z. Li, 2005)
- Domiporta filaris (Linnaeus, 1771)
- Domiporta gloriola (Cernohorsky, 1970)
- Domiporta granatina (Lamarck, 1811)
- Domiporta hebes (Reeve, 1845)
- Domiporta hibiscula S.-I Huang & Q.-Y. Chuo, 2019
- Domiporta latistriata (Herrmann & Salisbury, 2012)
- Domiporta lichtlei (Herrmann & Salisbury, 2012)
- Domiporta manoui Huang, 2011
- Domiporta nivisplumae Gori, Lorenz & R. Salisbury, 2024
- Domiporta praestantissima (Röding, 1798)
- Domiporta shikamai Habe, 1980
- Domiporta sigillata (Azuma, 1965)
- Domiporta valdacantamessae S. J. Maxwell, Dekkers, Berschauer & Congdon, 2017

=== Species brought into synonymy ===
- Domiporta citharoidea: synonym of Roseomitra citharoidea (Dohrn, 1862)
- Domiporta dianneae: synonym of Scabricola dianneae (Salisbury & Guillot de Suduiraut, 2003)
- Domiporta filiaris [sic] : synonym of Domiporta filaris (Linnaeus, 1771)
- Domiporta polycincta: synonym of Imbricaria polycincta (Turner, 2007)
- Domiporta roseovitta S.-I Huang, 2011: synonym of Roseomitra roseovitta (Huang, 2011) (original combination)
- Domiporta rufilirata: synonym of Imbricaria rufilirata (Adams & Reeve, 1850)
- Domiporta strangei: synonym of Roseomitra strangei (Angas, 1867)

== Gallery ==
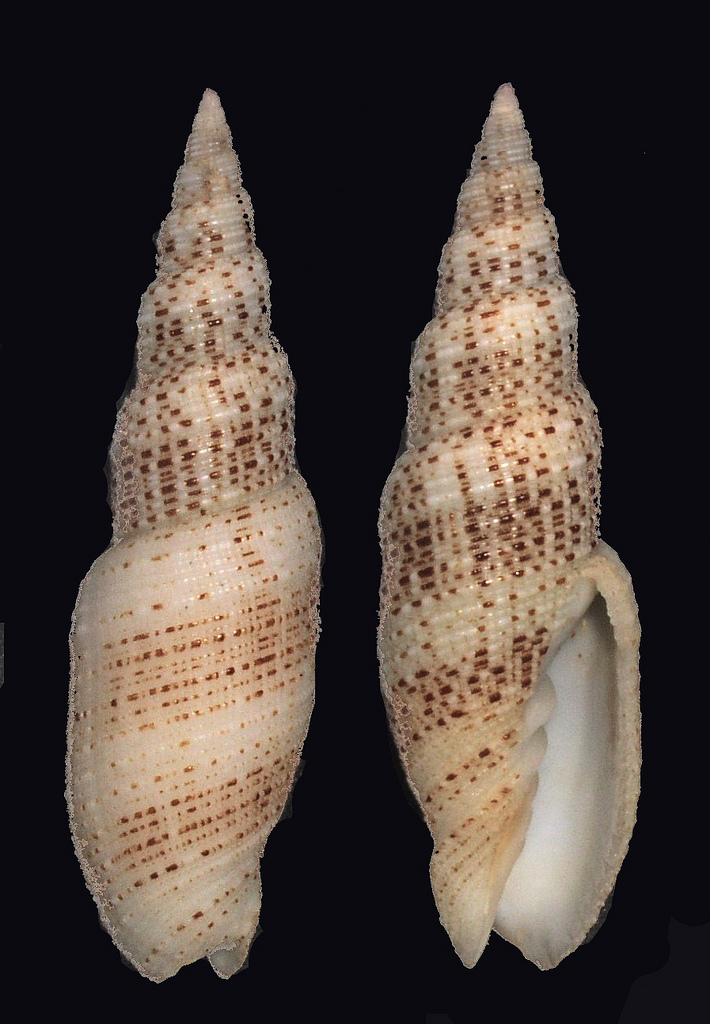
Domiporta gloriola

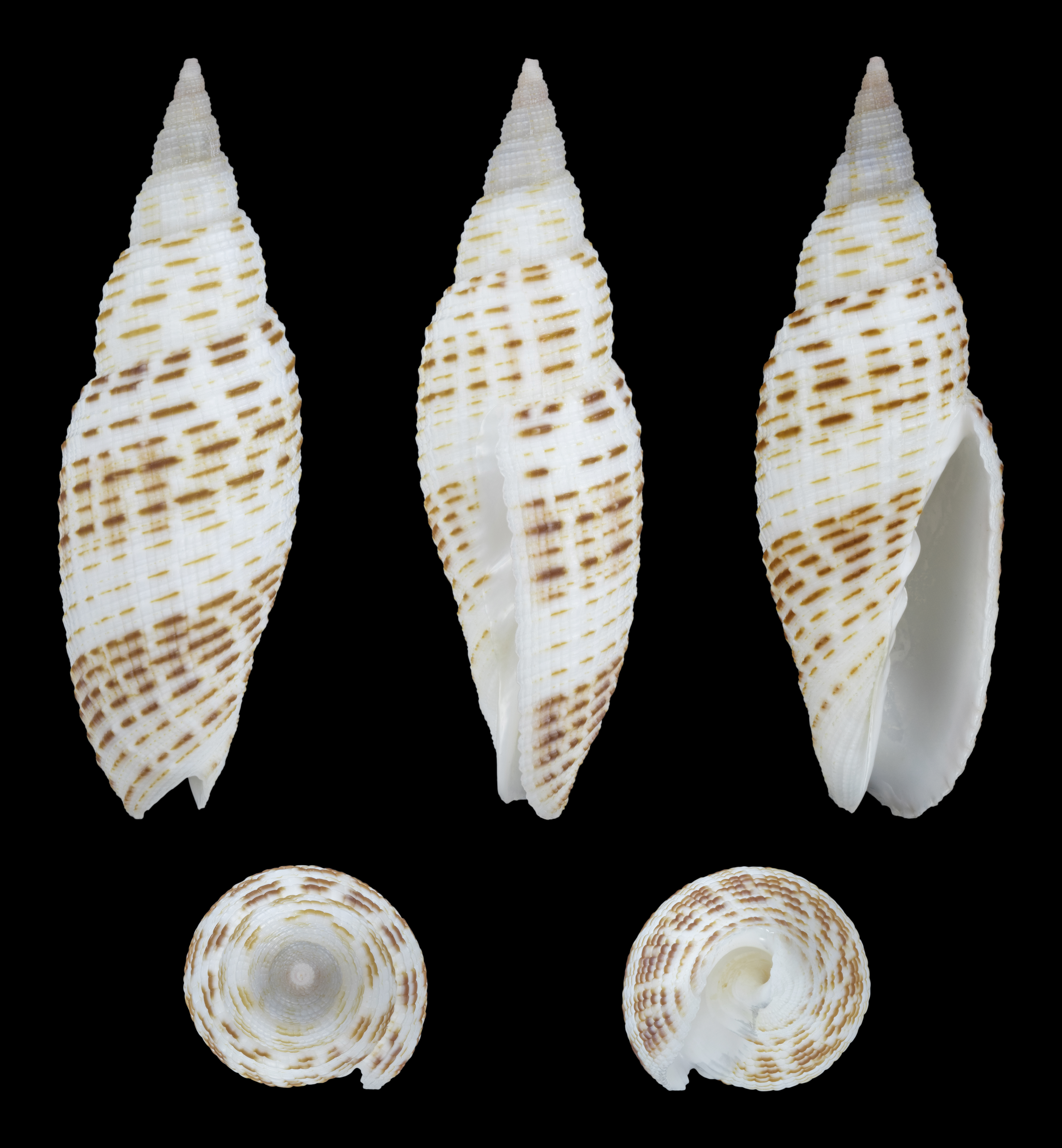
Domiporta granatina

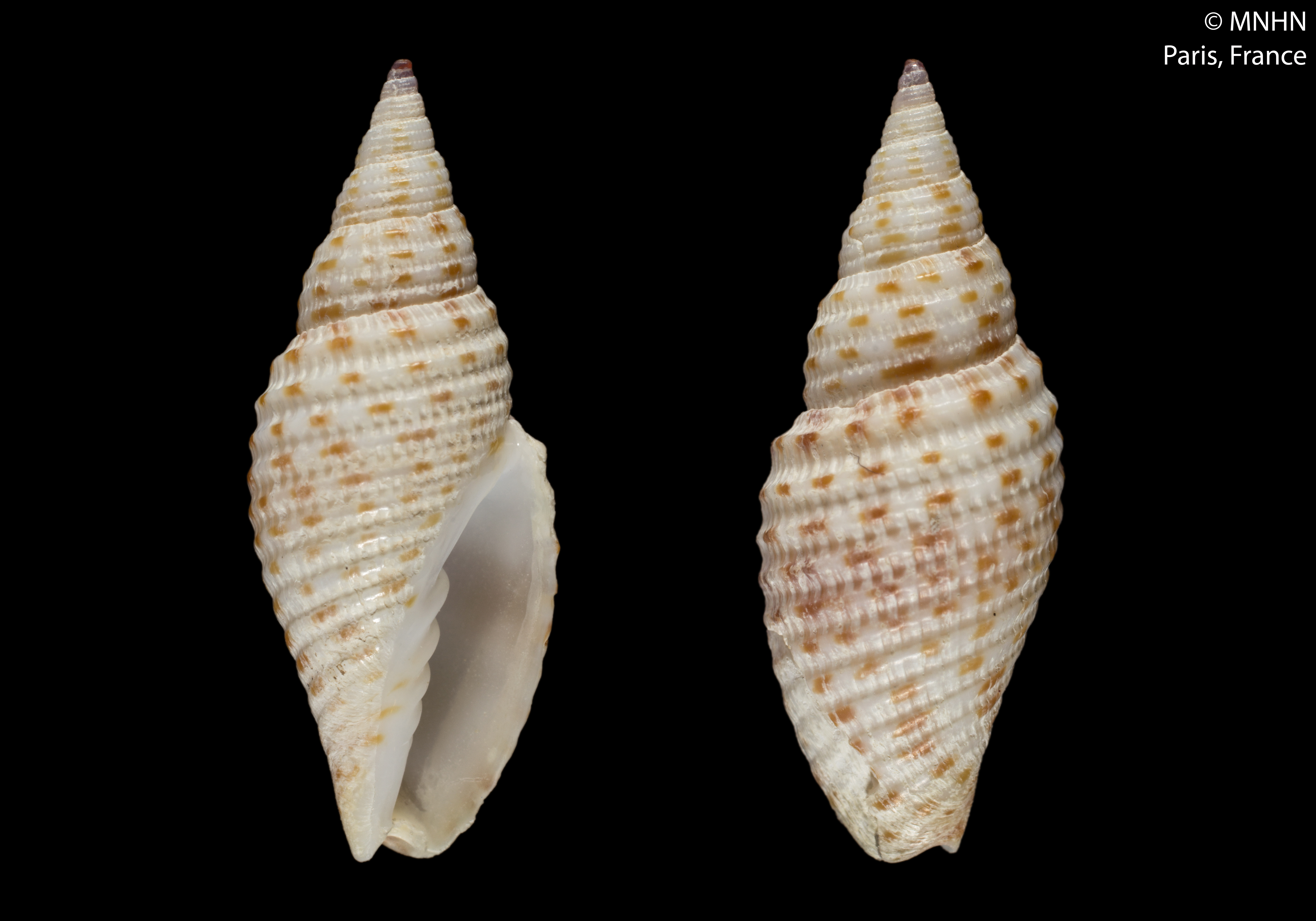
Domiporta latistriata

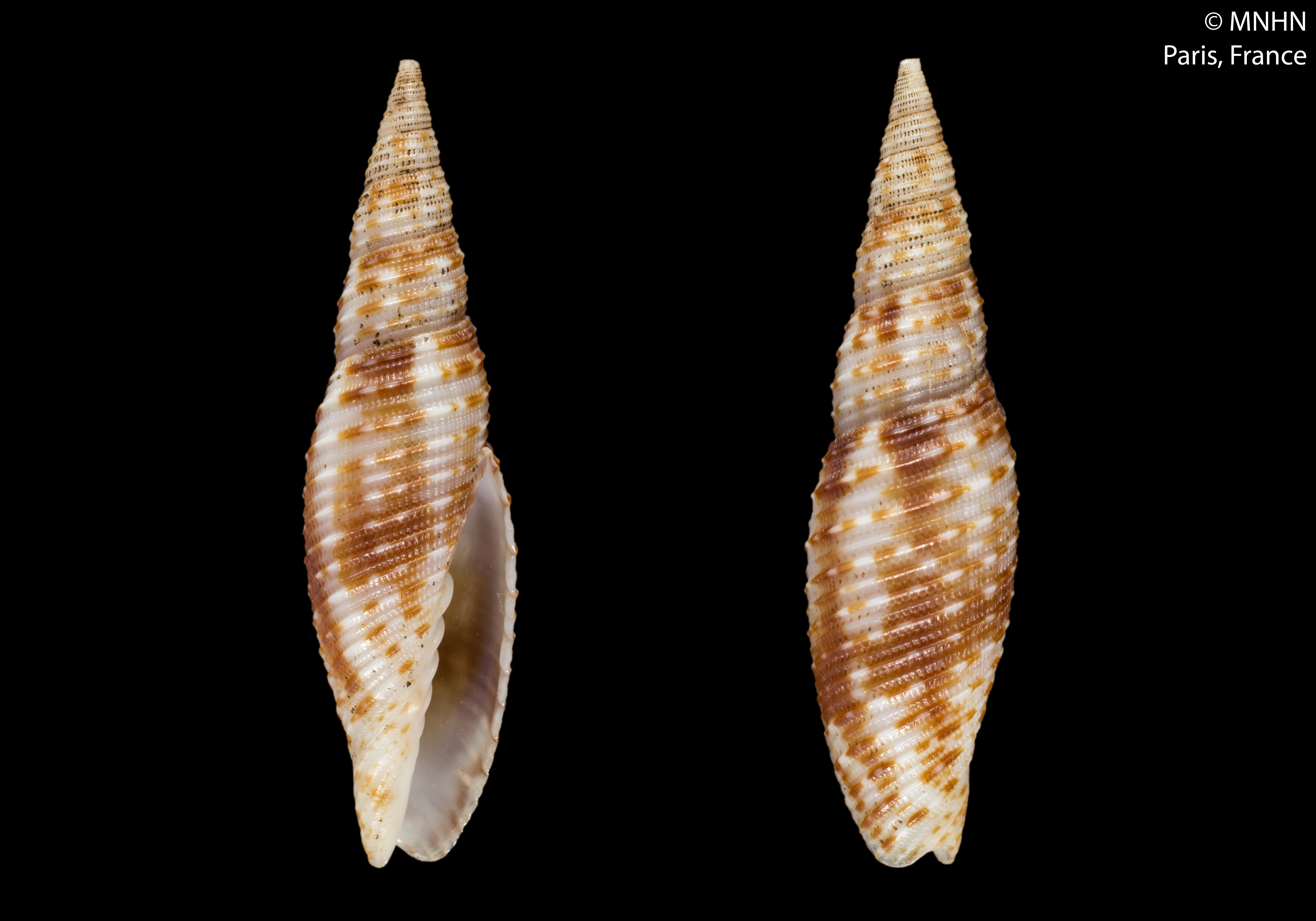
Domiporta lichtlei

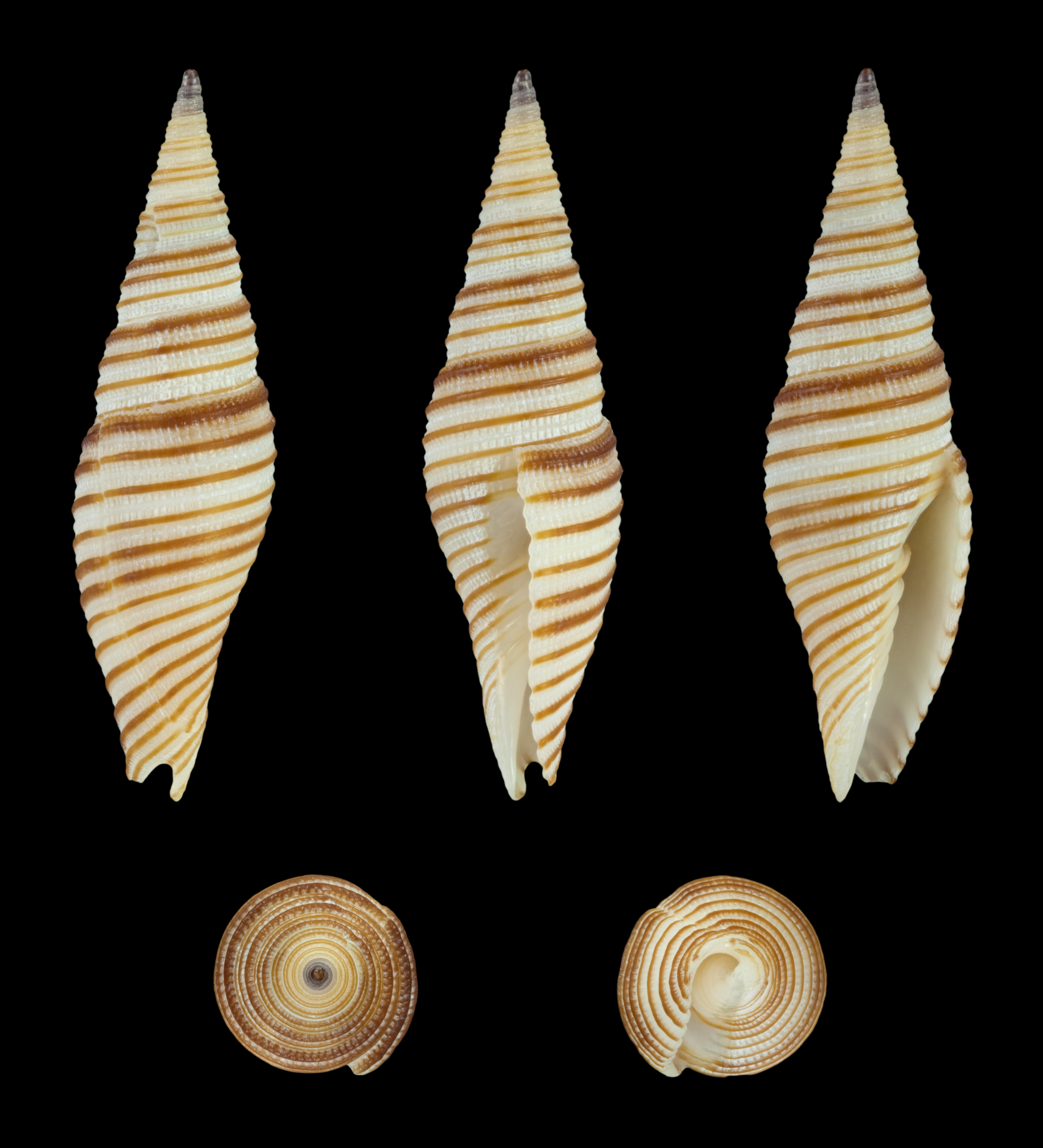
Domiporta praestantissima

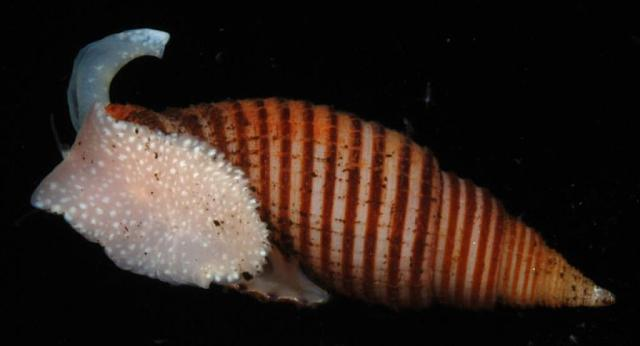
Alive member of Domiporta filaris
