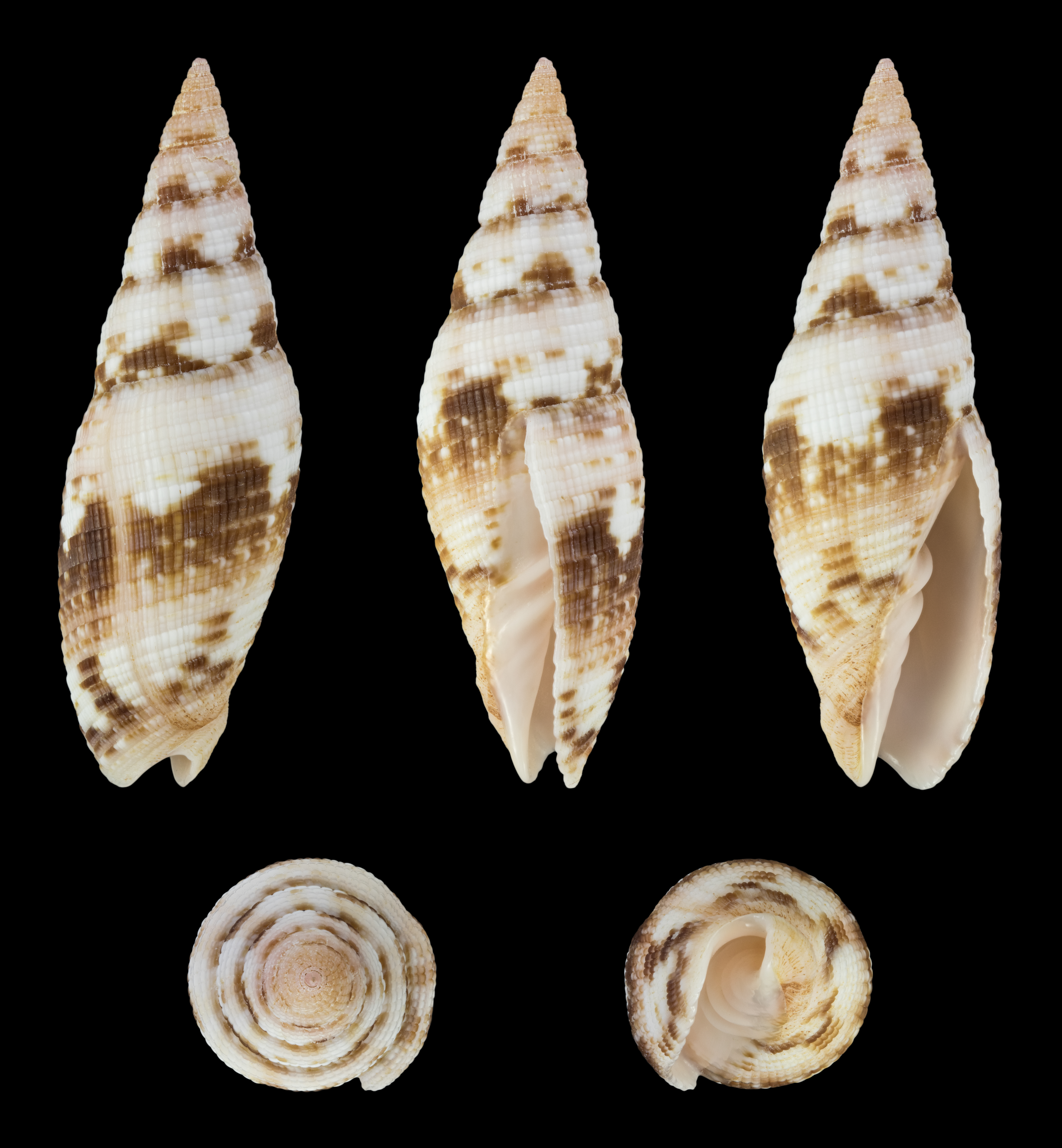

Scientific classification
- Kingdom: Animalia
- Phylum: Mollusca
- Class: Gastropoda
- Subclass: Caenogastropoda
- Order: Neogastropoda
- Superfamily: Mitroidea
- Family: Mitridae
- Subfamily: Imbricariinae
- Genus: Neocancilla
- Species: N. maculosa

Binomial name
- Neocancilla maculosa (Gmelin, 1791)

Synonyms
- Voluta maculosa Gmelin, 1791

= Neocancilla maculosa =

Species of gastropod

Neocancilla maculosa is a species of sea snail, a marine gastropod mollusk, in the family Mitridae, the miters or miter snails.
