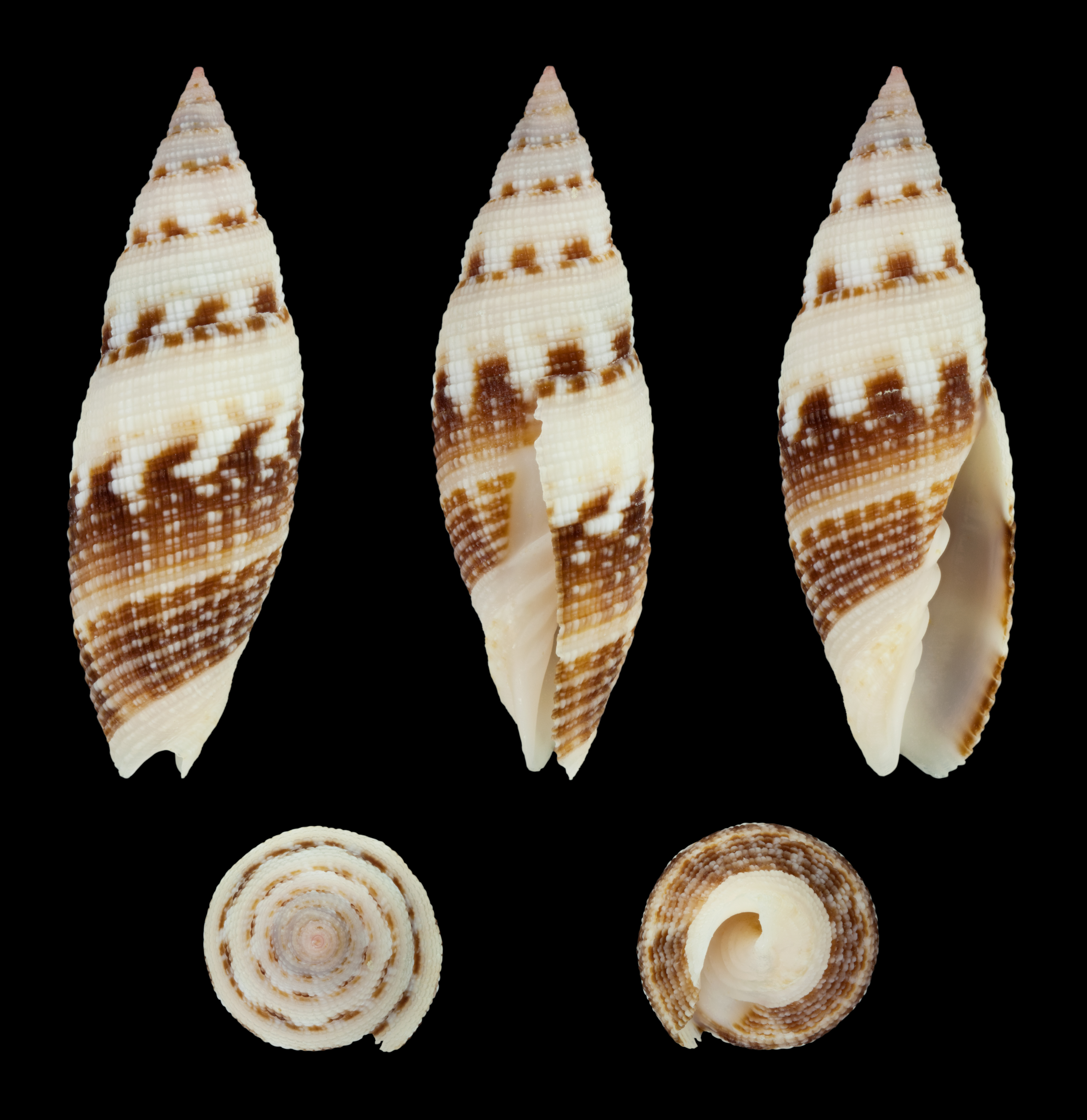

Scientific classification
- Kingdom: Animalia
- Phylum: Mollusca
- Class: Gastropoda
- Subclass: Caenogastropoda
- Order: Neogastropoda
- Family: Mitridae
- Genus: Neocancilla
- Species: N. clathrus

Binomial name
- Neocancilla clathrus (Gmelin, 1791)

Synonyms
- Mitra crenifera Lamarck, 1811

= Neocancilla clathrus =

Species of gastropod

Neocancilla clathrus is a species of sea snail, a marine gastropod mollusk in the family Mitridae, the miters or miter snails.
