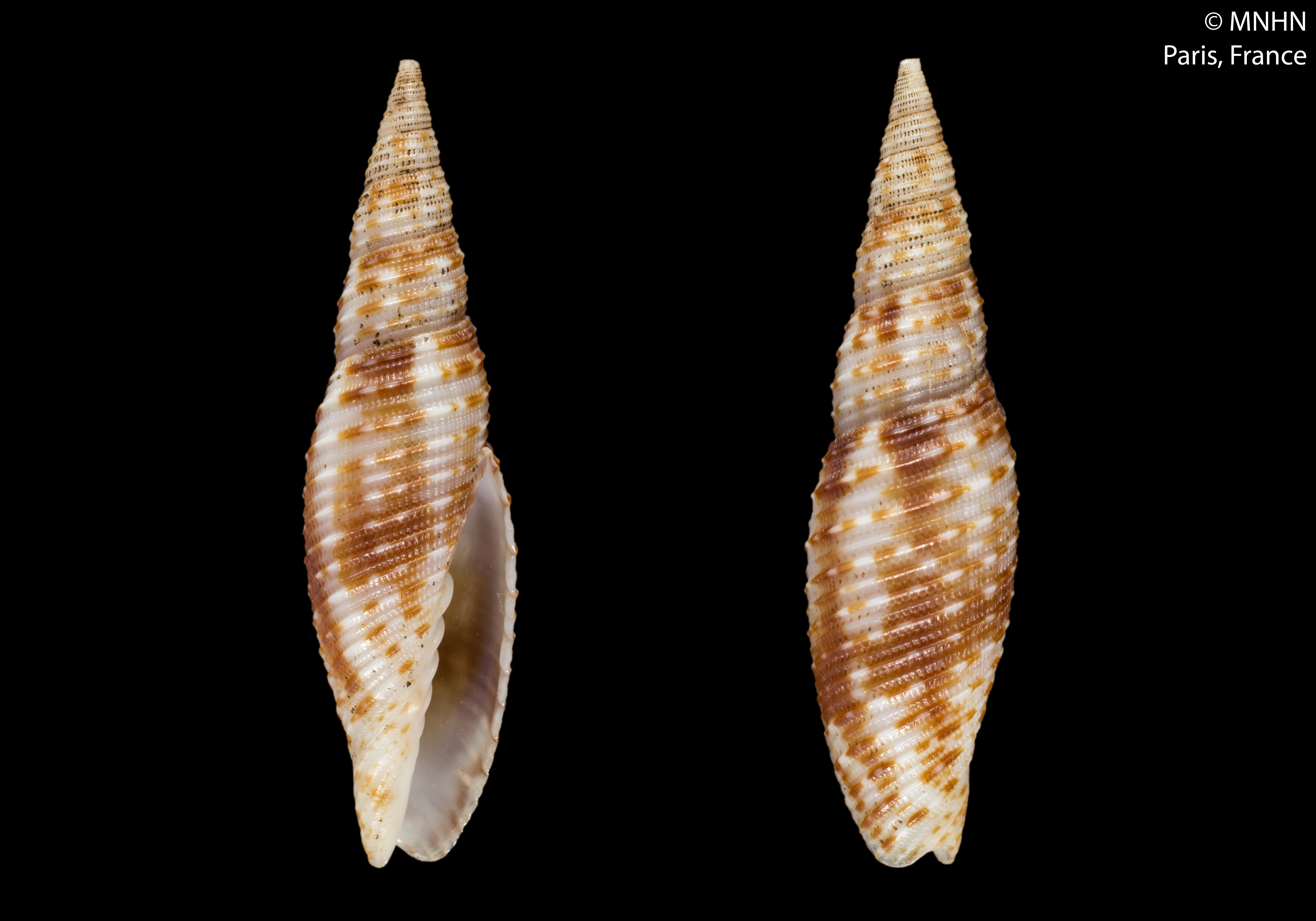
- Domiporta lichtlei

Scientific classification
- Kingdom: Animalia
- Phylum: Mollusca
- Class: Gastropoda
- Subclass: Caenogastropoda
- Order: Neogastropoda
- Superfamily: Mitroidea
- Family: Mitridae
- Subfamily: Mitrinae
- Genus: Domiporta
- Species: D. lichtlei

Binomial name
- Domiporta lichtlei (Herrmann & Salisbury, 2012)

Synonyms
- Subcancilla lichtlei Herrmann & Salisbury, 2012

= Domiporta lichtlei =

Species of gastropod

Domiporta lichtlei is a species of sea snail, a marine gastropod mollusk, in the family Mitridae, the miters or miter snails.
