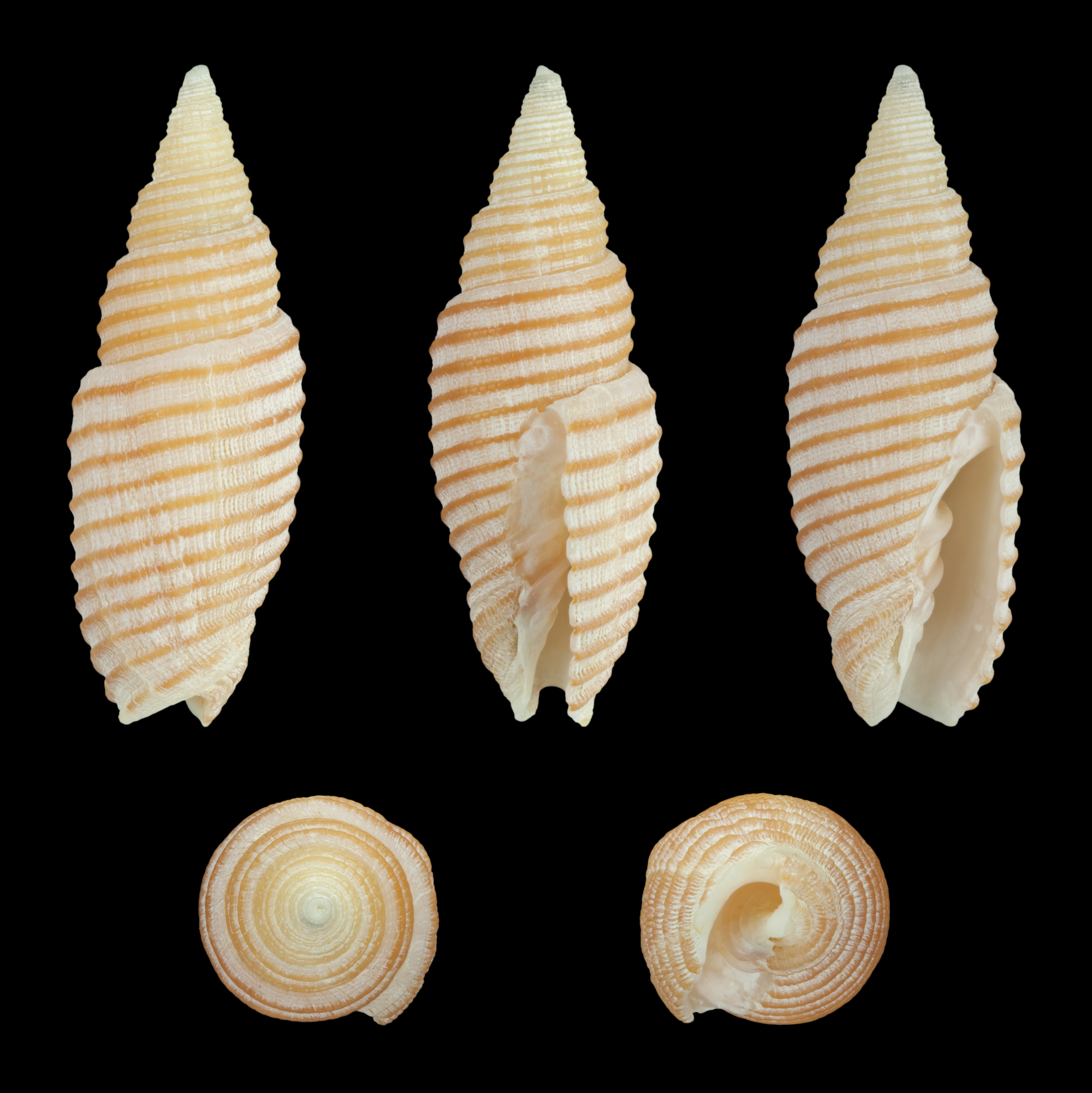

Scientific classification
- Kingdom: Animalia
- Phylum: Mollusca
- Class: Gastropoda
- Subclass: Caenogastropoda
- Order: Neogastropoda
- Family: Mitridae
- Genus: Domiporta
- Species: D. filaris

Binomial name
- Domiporta filaris (Linnaeus, 1771)

Synonyms
- Cancilla (Domiporta) filaris (Linnaeus, 1771); Cancilla filaris (Linnaeus, 1771); Cancilla filiaris [sic] (misspelling); Domiporta filaris (Linnaeus, C., 1771); Domiporta filosa bernardiana Philippi, R.A., 1850; Mitra bornii Philippi, R.A., 1850; Mitra crebrilineata Sowerby, G.B. II, 1874; Mitra filaris (Linnaeus, 1771); Mitra filiaris [sic] (misspelling); Mitra nexilis "Martyn, T." Lamarck, J.B.P.A. de, 1811; Voluta filaris Linnaeus, 1771 (original combination); Voluta filosa Born, I. von, 1778; Voluta leucosticta Gmelin, J.F., 1791

= Domiporta filaris =

Species of gastropod

Domiporta filaris, commonly known as the file mitre, is a species of sea snail, a marine gastropod mollusc in the family Mitridae, the miters or miter snails.

== Description ==
The shell size varies between 14 mm and 55 mm.

== Distribution ==
This species occurs in the Red Sea, in the Indian Ocean off Chagos and the Mascarene Basin and in the Pacific Ocean off Hawaii and Australia.
