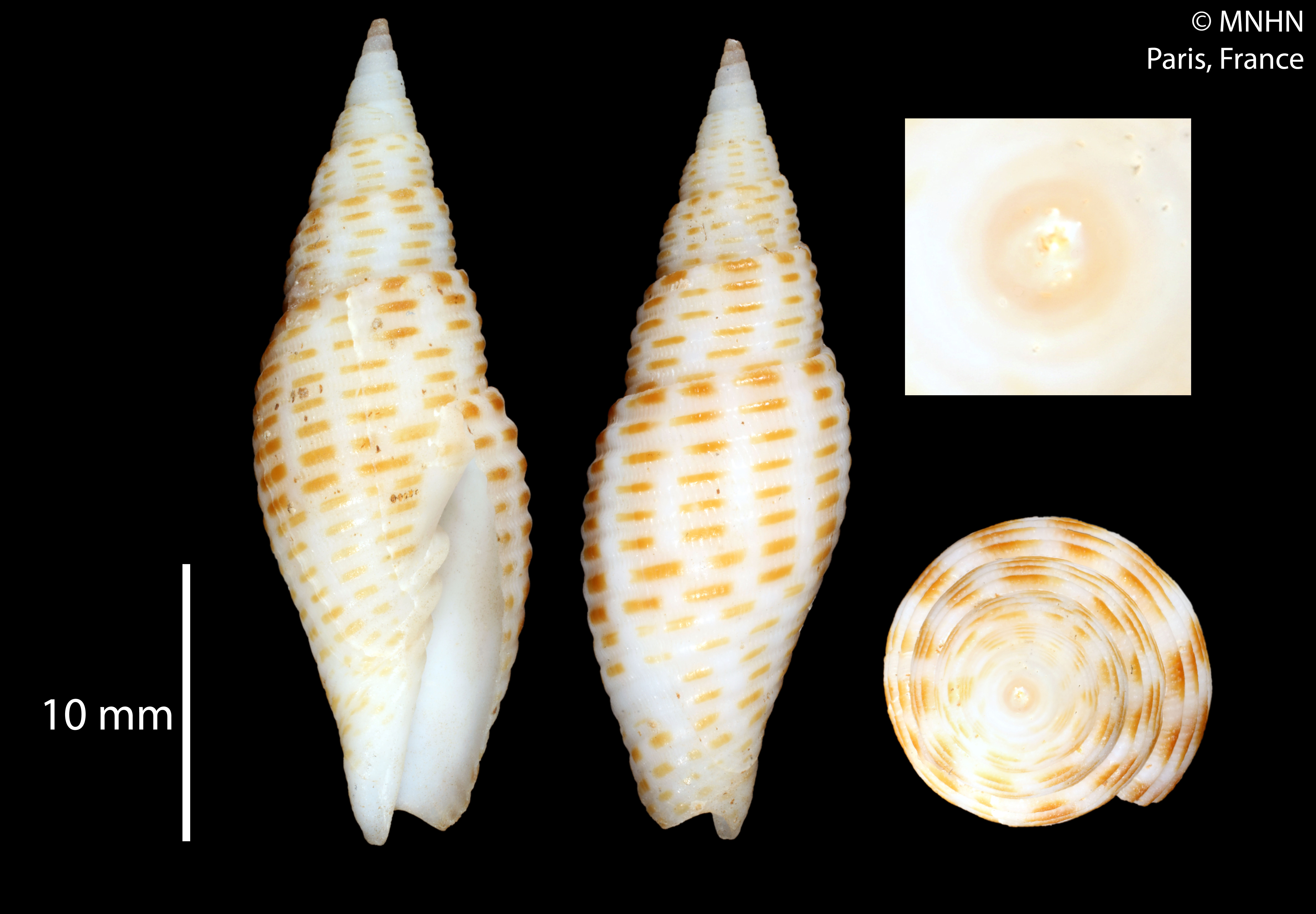
- Shell of Roseomitra honkeri (paratype at MNHN, Paris)

Scientific classification
- Kingdom: Animalia
- Phylum: Mollusca
- Class: Gastropoda
- Subclass: Caenogastropoda
- Order: Neogastropoda
- Family: Mitridae
- Genus: Roseomitra
- Species: R. honkeri

Binomial name
- Roseomitra honkeri (Poppe, Tagaro & Salisbury, 2009)

Synonyms
- Mitra honkeri Poppe, Tagaro & Salisbury, 2009

= Roseomitra honkeri =

Species of gastropod

Roseomitra honkeri is a species of sea snail, a marine gastropod mollusk in the family Mitridae, the miters or miter snails.

== Distribution ==
This marine species occurs off the Philippines.
