= Neocancilla hemmenae =

Scientific classification
- Kingdom: Animalia
- Phylum: Mollusca
- Class: Gastropoda
- Subclass: Caenogastropoda
- Order: Neogastropoda
- Family: Mitridae
- Genus: Neocancilla
- Species: N. hemmenae

Binomial name
- Neocancilla hemmenae Salisbury & Heinicke, 1993

Species of gastropod

Neocancilla hemmenae is a species of sea snail, a marine gastropod mollusk in the family Mitridae, the miters or miter snails.
