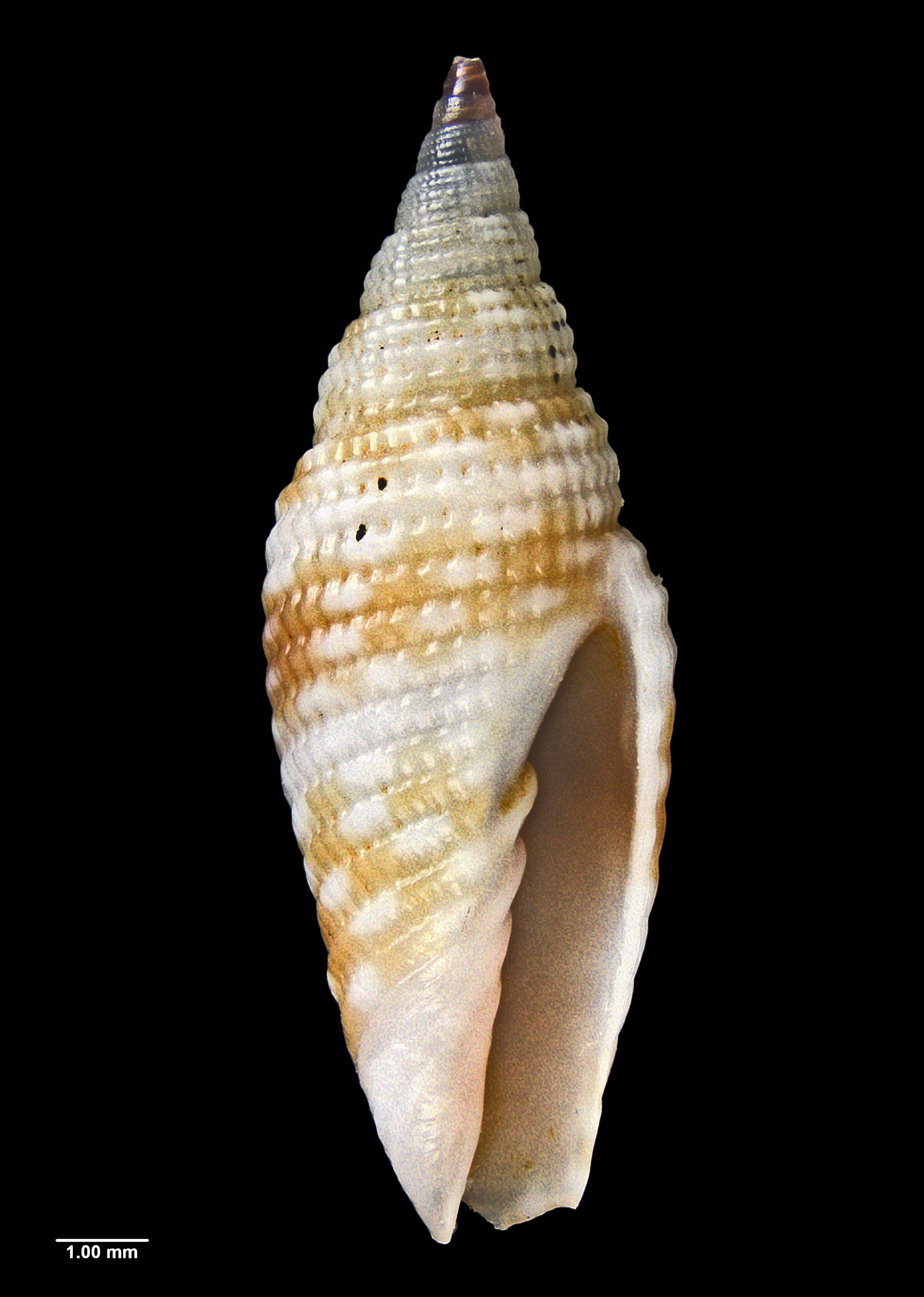
- Holotype

Scientific classification
- Kingdom: Animalia
- Phylum: Mollusca
- Class: Gastropoda
- Subclass: Caenogastropoda
- Order: Neogastropoda
- Family: Mitridae
- Genus: Roseomitra
- Species: R. earlei

Binomial name
- Roseomitra earlei (Cernohorsky, 1977)

Synonyms
- Mitra earlei Cernohorsky, 1977

= Roseomitra earlei =

Species of gastropod

Roseomitra earlei is a species of sea snail, a marine gastropod mollusk in the family Mitridae, the miters or miter snails.
