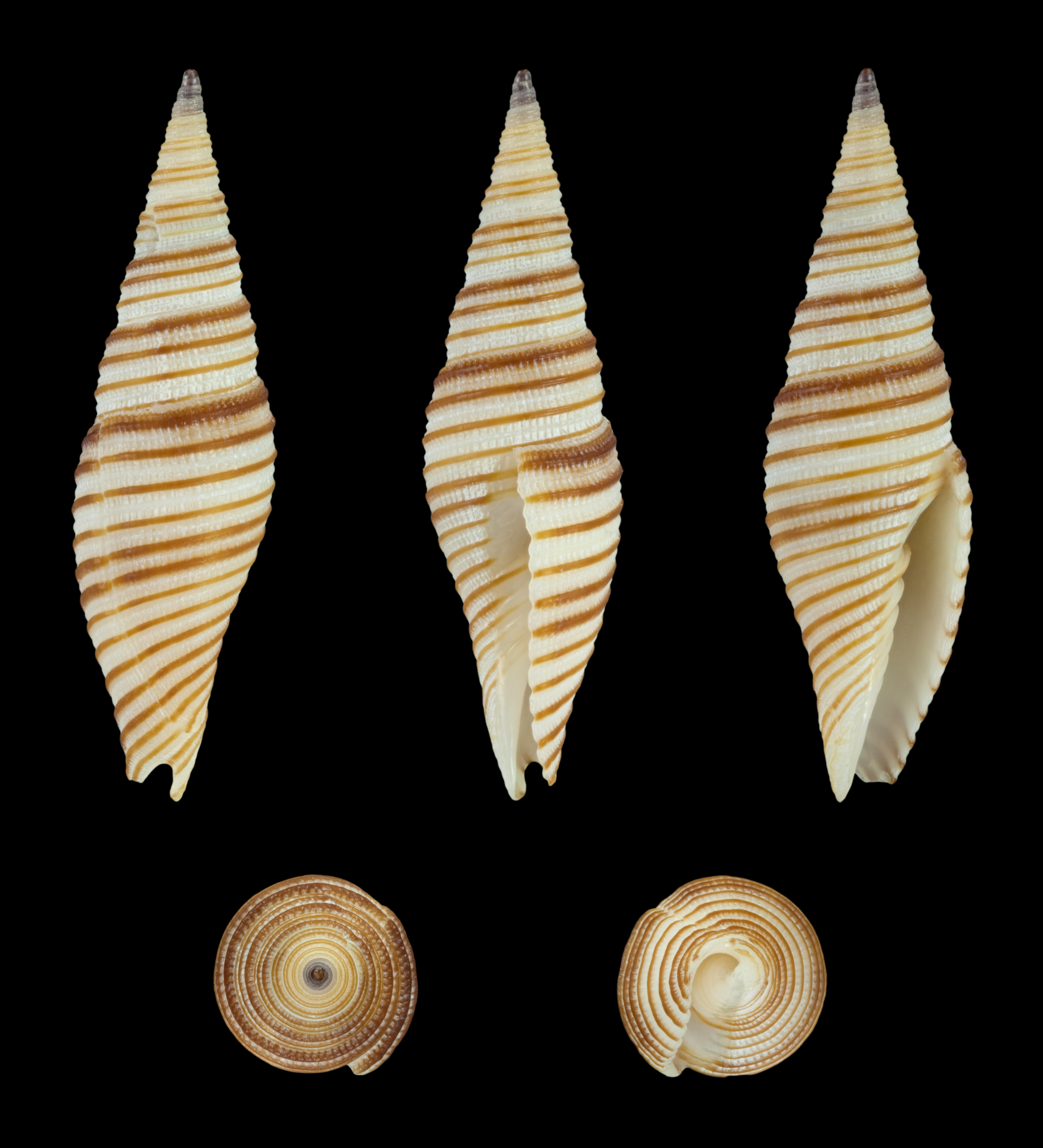

Scientific classification
- Kingdom: Animalia
- Phylum: Mollusca
- Class: Gastropoda
- Subclass: Caenogastropoda
- Order: Neogastropoda
- Family: Mitridae
- Genus: Domiporta
- Species: D. praestantissima

Binomial name
- Domiporta praestantissima (Röding, 1758)

Synonyms
- Cancilla (Domiporta) praestantissima (Röding, 1798); Cancilla praestantissima (Röding, 1798); Mitra praestantissima Röding, 1798; Subcancilla praestantissima (Röding, 1798)

= Domiporta praestantissima =

Species of gastropod

Domiporta praestantissima, the most superior mitre, is a species of sea snail, a marine gastropod mollusk in the miter snail family.

== Description ==
The shell size varies between 20 mm and 61 mm.

== Distribution ==
This species occurs in the Red Sea, in the Indian Ocean off Madagascar, Mauritius and the Mascarene Basin; in the Pacific Ocean off Polynesia and off Japan.
