= Roseomitra fluctuosa =

Scientific classification
- Kingdom: Animalia
- Phylum: Mollusca
- Class: Gastropoda
- Subclass: Caenogastropoda
- Order: Neogastropoda
- Superfamily: Mitroidea
- Family: Mitridae
- Subfamily: Mitrinae
- Genus: Roseomitra
- Species: R. fluctuosa

Binomial name
- Roseomitra fluctuosa (Herrmann & Salisbury, 2013)

Synonyms
- Cancilla fluctuosa Herrmann & Salisbury, 2013

Species of gastropod

Roseomitra fluctuosa is a species of sea snail, a marine gastropod mollusk, in the family Mitridae, the miters or miter snails.
