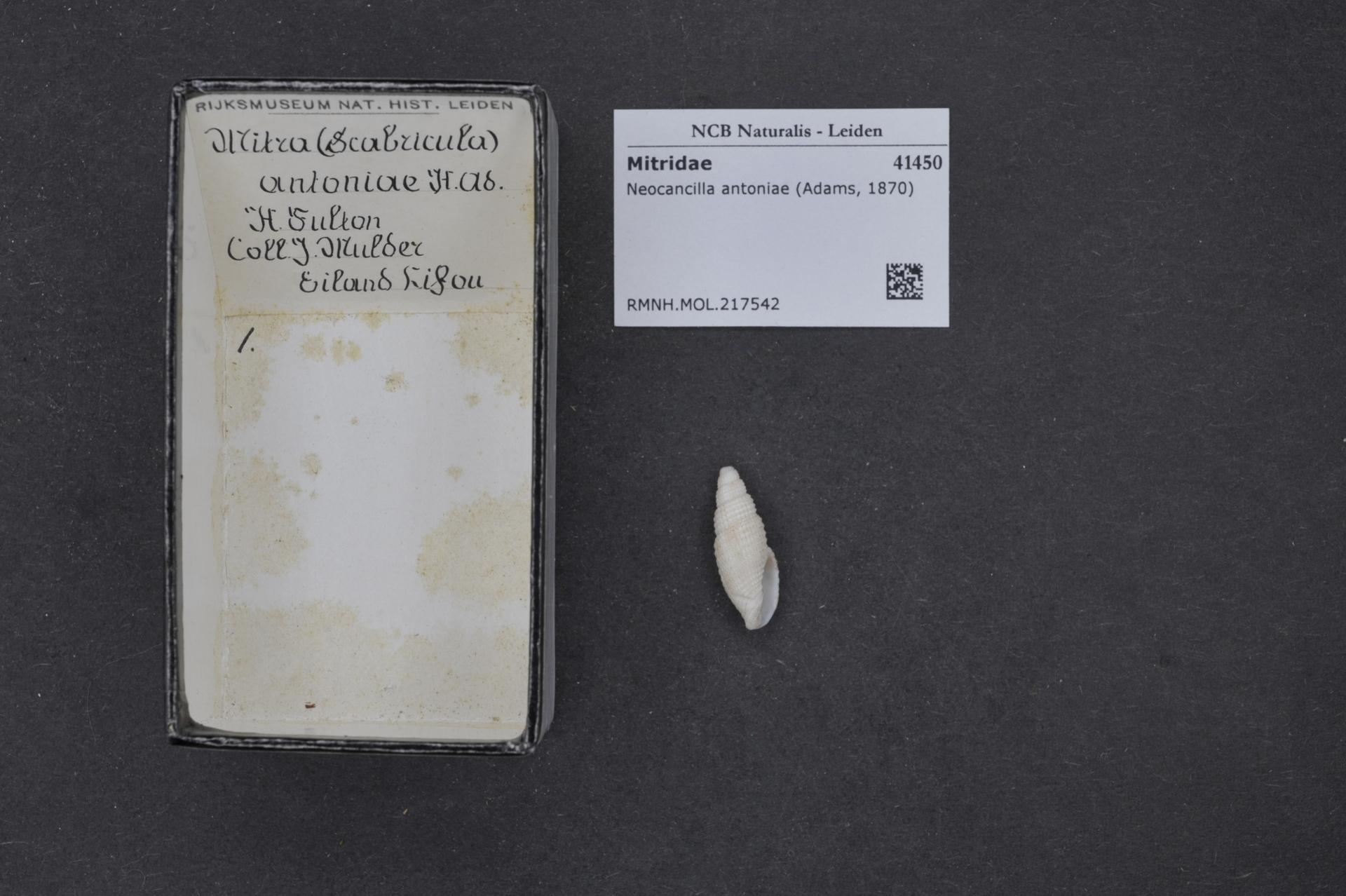
- Preserved specimen

Scientific classification
- Kingdom: Animalia
- Phylum: Mollusca
- Class: Gastropoda
- Subclass: Caenogastropoda
- Order: Neogastropoda
- Family: Mitridae
- Genus: Neocancilla
- Species: N. antoniae

Binomial name
- Neocancilla antoniae H. Adams

= Neocancilla antoniae =

Species of gastropod

Neocancilla antoniae is a species of sea snail, a marine gastropod mollusk in the family Mitridae, the miters or miter snails.
