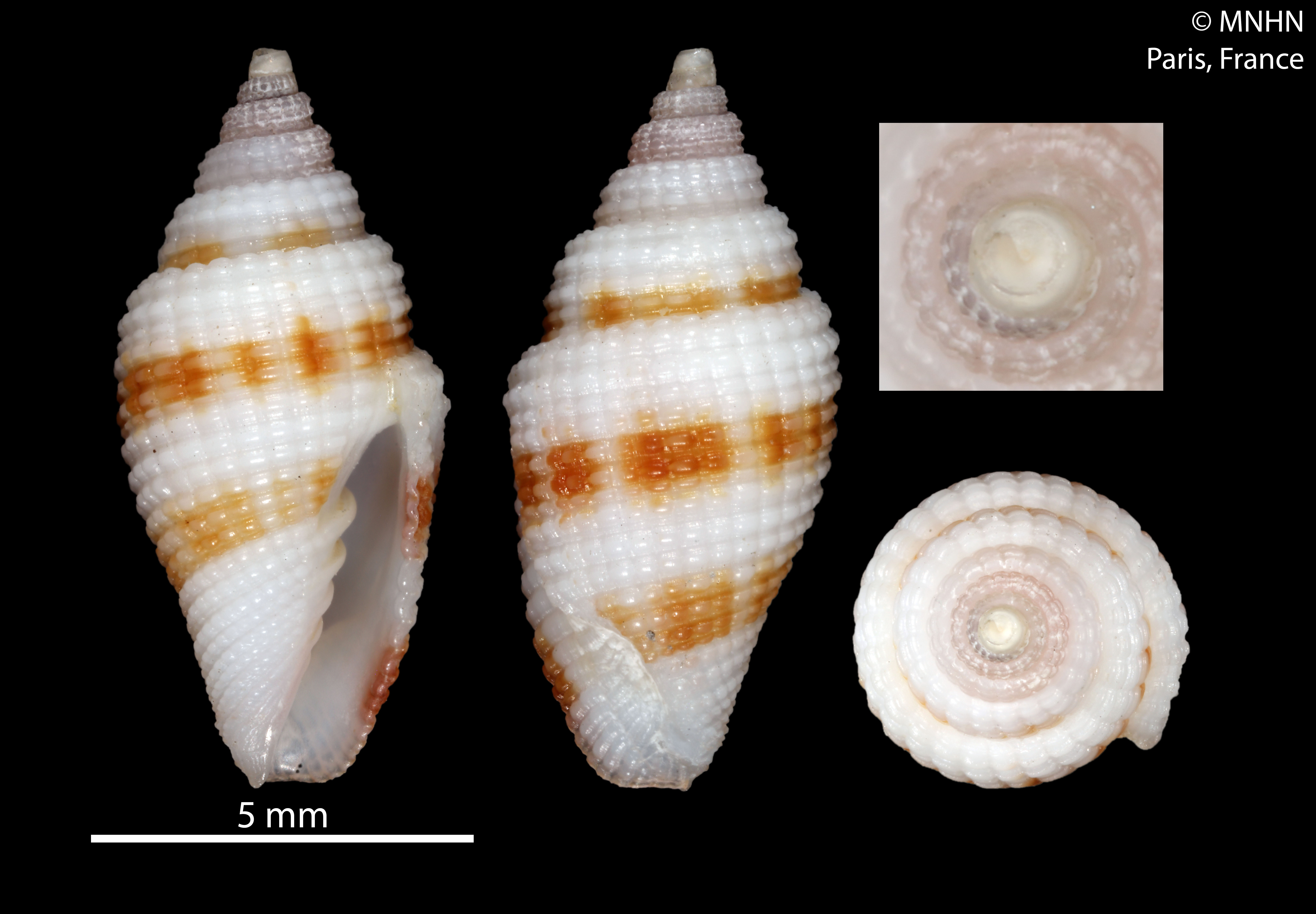
- Shell of Roseomitra tagaroae (paratype at MNHN, Paris)

Scientific classification
- Kingdom: Animalia
- Phylum: Mollusca
- Class: Gastropoda
- Subclass: Caenogastropoda
- Order: Neogastropoda
- Family: Mitridae
- Genus: Roseomitra
- Species: R. tagaroae

Binomial name
- Roseomitra tagaroae (Poppe, 2008)

Synonyms
- Mitra tagaroae Poppe, 2008

= Roseomitra tagaroae =

Species of gastropod

Roseomitra tagaroae is a species of sea snail, a marine gastropod mollusk in subfamily Mitrinae of the family Mitridae, the miters or miter snails

== Description ==
The length of the shell attains 9.7 mm.

== Distribution ==
This marine species occurs off the Philippines.
