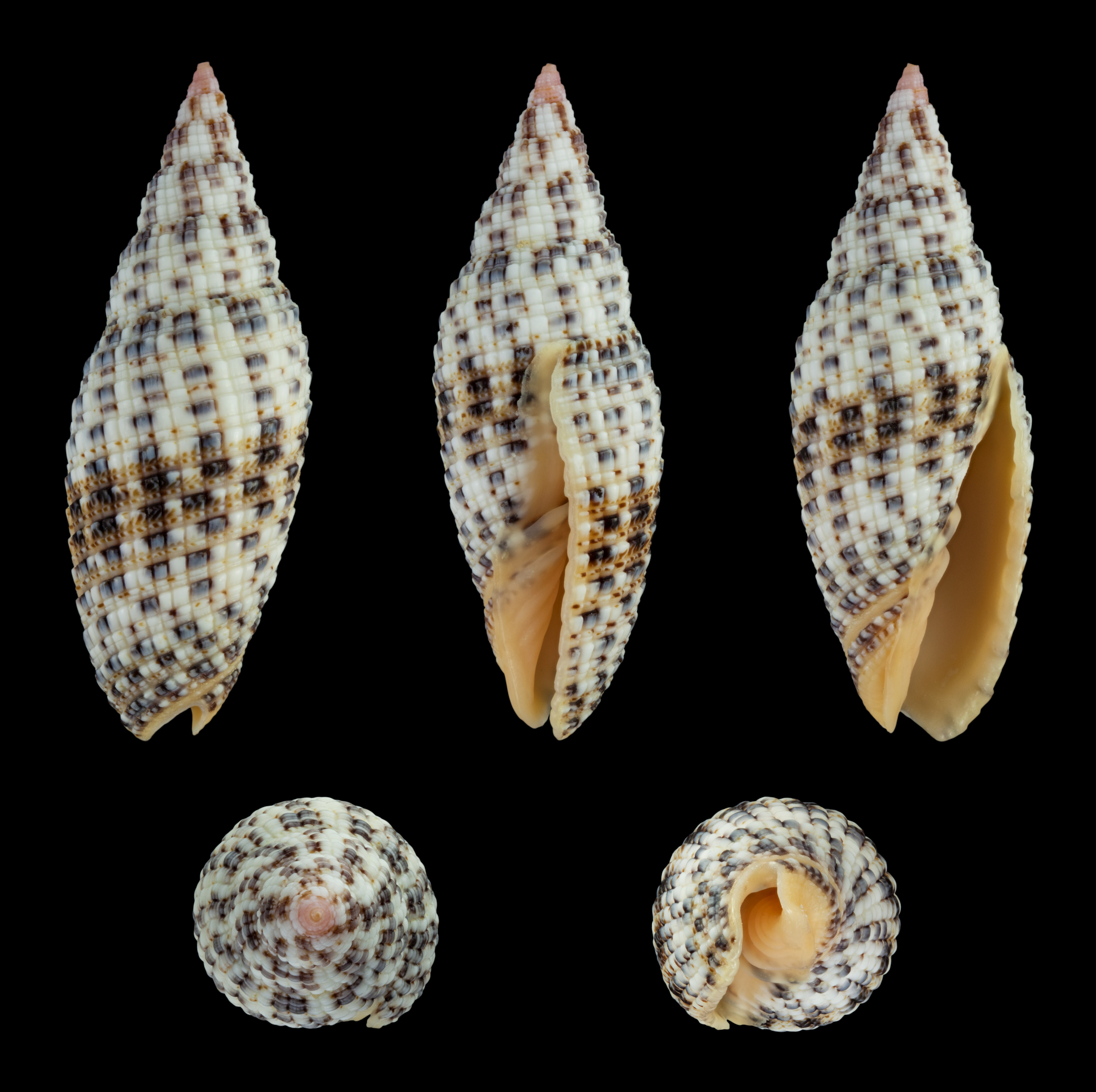
- Shell of Neocancilla papilio

Scientific classification
- Kingdom: Animalia
- Phylum: Mollusca
- Class: Gastropoda
- Subclass: Caenogastropoda
- Order: Neogastropoda
- Family: Mitridae
- Genus: Neocancilla
- Species: N. papilio

Binomial name
- Neocancilla papilio (Link, 1807)

Synonyms
- Mitra scabriuscula Lamarck, 1811; Mitra sphaerulata Martyn, 1784 (non-binominal); Scabricola scabriuscula (Lamarck, 1811); Voluta leucostoma Gmelin, 1791; Voluta papilio Link, 1807 (original combination)

= Neocancilla papilio =

Species of gastropod

Neocancilla papilio is a species of sea snail, a marine gastropod mollusk in the family Mitridae, the miters or miter snails.

== Subspecies ==
- Neocancilla papilio emersoni (Pilsbry, 1921)
- Neocancilla papilio langfordiana (J. Cate, 1962)
- Neocancilla papilio papilio (Link, 1807)

== Description ==
The shell is sculptured with thick beaded ridges.

== Distribution ==
This marine species occurs off Papua New Guinea.
