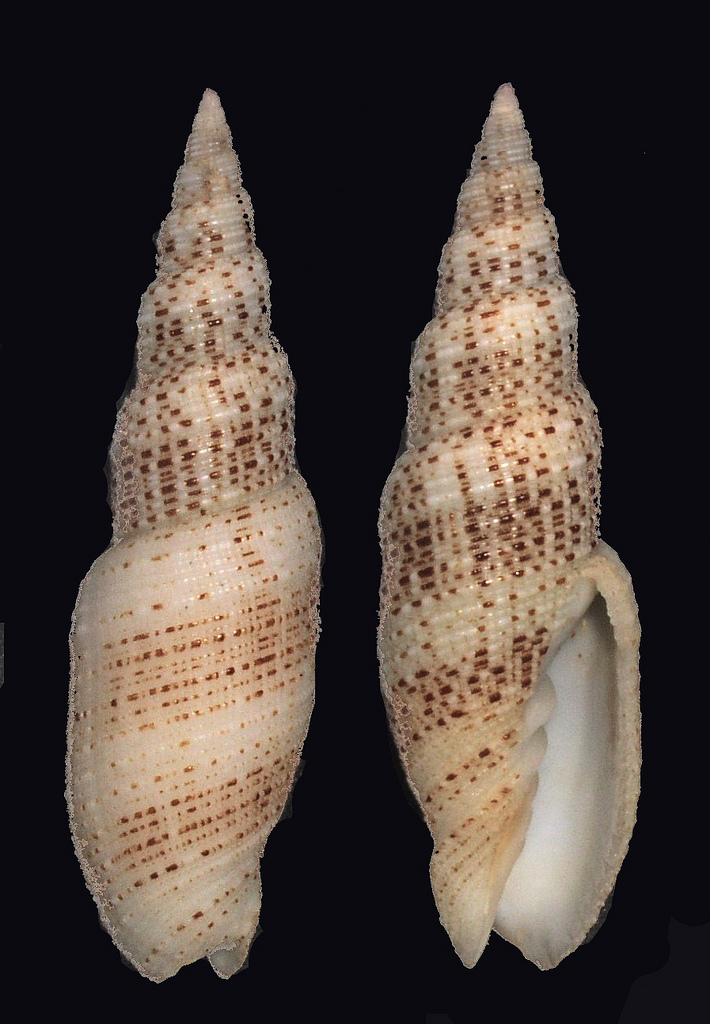

Scientific classification
- Kingdom: Animalia
- Phylum: Mollusca
- Class: Gastropoda
- Subclass: Caenogastropoda
- Order: Neogastropoda
- Family: Mitridae
- Genus: Domiporta
- Species: D. gloriola

Binomial name
- Domiporta gloriola (Cernohorsky, 1970)

Synonyms
- Cancilla (Domiporta) gloriola (Cernohorsky, 1970); Cancilla gloriola Cernohorsky, 1970 (original combination); Mitra gracilis Reeve, 1844 (invalid: junior homonym of Mitra gravilis H.C. Lea, 1841); Mitra (Scabricola) gracilis Reeve, 1882; Neocancilla gloriola (Cernohorsky, 1970)

= Domiporta gloriola =

Species of gastropod

Domiporta gloriola, the glorious mitre, is a species of sea snail, a marine gastropod mollusc in the family Mitridae, the miters or miter snails. D. gloriola is primarily found in intertidal or sandy areas up to a depth of 40 m (130 ft) primarily in the tropical and subtropical Pacific Ocean, including the Philippines and Indonesia. Additional sightings have been reported in the Red Sea, and in the western Indian Ocean at Zanzibar.

== Description ==
D. gloriola has a medium sized shell, is elongated with a tall spire and convex whorls. It is sculptured with spiral cords and axially striate interspaces. The aperture of the species is equal to the spire length, and the species has a thickened and crenulate outer lip. D. gloriola has a columella with 5 folds, and is off-white in colour. In addition to this, the species has two weakly reddish-brown bands along its body whorl, as well as interrupted brown spiral lines, and spiral cords that are speckled with numerous spots that are white or blackish-brown in colour. The species' shell height ranges between 40–67 mm (1.6–2.6 in), a width between 11.9–15 mm (0.47–0.59 in), and has an aperture height of between 23.2–25.8 mm (0.91–1.02 in).

The species is visually similar to D. granatina, matching size, sculpture and their colour patterns. The shells of D. gloriola can be identified due to being roundly subangulate, more slender, fusiform-elongate and less inflated in shape, more numerous whorla (9-11 in D. gloriola, compared to 7-8 in D. granatina) and a shorter aperture in relation to the total shell size.

== Taxonomy ==
The species was first described as Mitra gracilis in 1844 by Lovell Augustus Reeve. In 1970, Walter Oliver Cernohorsky gave the species the provisional name Cancilla (Domiporta) gloriola, after finding that the name given by Reeve was invalid name due to a different species being described using this name in 1841 by Isaac Lea. By 1977, Cernohorsky had begun to describe Domiporta as a genus, and in 1989, Domiporta was described as a genus by Vaught, Abbott and Boss, which in turn led the species' preferred name to be Domiporta gloriola. Three syntypes of the species are held in the collections of the Natural History Museum, London.

== Distribution and habitat ==
This species occurs in the Pacific Ocean in areas such as the Philippines, Australia, New Guinea, Okinawa and the Ōsumi Islands in the Ryukyu Islands of southern Japan, Indonesia, the Red Sea, and Zanzibar in the western Indian Ocean. The type locality of the species is Ticao Island in the Philippines, at a depth of 11 m (36 ft) from the shore.

The species tends to live in coral sand, from the intertidal zone up to a depth of 40 m (130 ft).

== Gallery ==
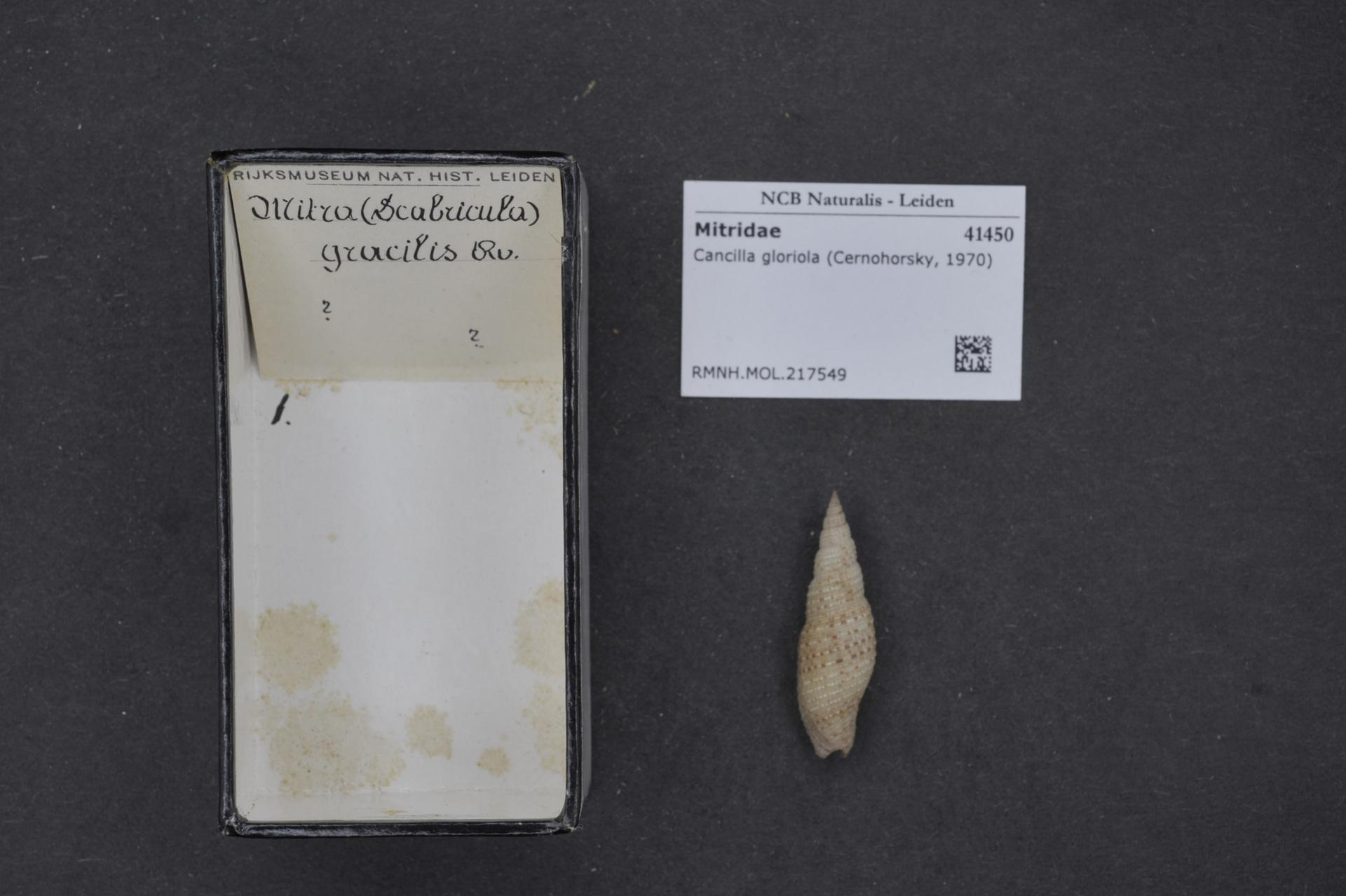
Type specimen from the Rijksmuseum van Natuurlijke Historie

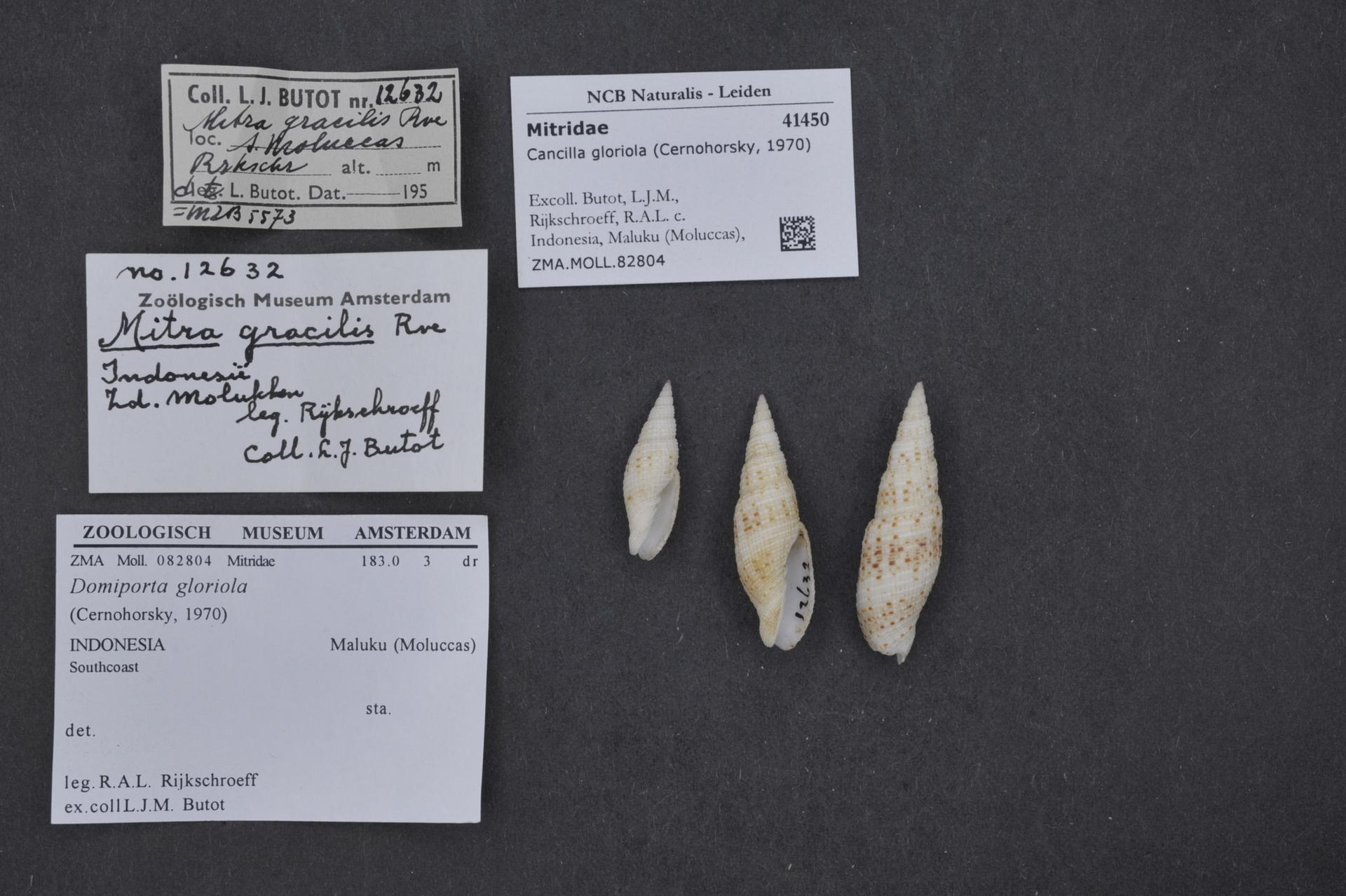
Type specimen from the Rijksmuseum van Natuurlijke Historie
