= Neocancilla kayae =

Scientific classification
- Kingdom: Animalia
- Phylum: Mollusca
- Class: Gastropoda
- Subclass: Caenogastropoda
- Order: Neogastropoda
- Family: Mitridae
- Genus: Neocancilla
- Species: N. kayae

Binomial name
- Neocancilla kayae Cernohorsky, 1978

Species of gastropod

Neocancilla kayae is a species of sea snail, a marine gastropod mollusk in the family Mitridae, with the family common name of miters or miter snails.
