= Neocancilla takiisaoi =

Scientific classification
- Kingdom: Animalia
- Phylum: Mollusca
- Class: Gastropoda
- Subclass: Caenogastropoda
- Order: Neogastropoda
- Family: Mitridae
- Genus: Neocancilla
- Species: N. takiisaoi

Binomial name
- Neocancilla takiisaoi (Kuroda, 1969)

Synonyms
- Vexillum takisaoi [sic] (misspelling)

Species of gastropod

Neocancilla takiisaoi is a species of sea snail, a marine gastropod mollusk in the family Mitridae, the miters or miter snails.

== Description ==
Shell size 50-55 mm.

== Distribution ==
This species occurs in the Indian Ocean in the Mascarene Basin.
