= Roseomitra reticulata =

Scientific classification
- Kingdom: Animalia
- Phylum: Mollusca
- Class: Gastropoda
- Subclass: Caenogastropoda
- Order: Neogastropoda
- Superfamily: Mitroidea
- Family: Mitridae
- Subfamily: Mitrinae
- Genus: Roseomitra
- Species: R. reticulata

Binomial name
- Roseomitra reticulata (A. Adams, 1853)

Synonyms
- Mitra reticulata A. Adams, 1853

Species of gastropod

Roseomitra reticulata is a species of sea snail, a marine gastropod mollusk, in the family Mitridae, the miters or miter snails.
