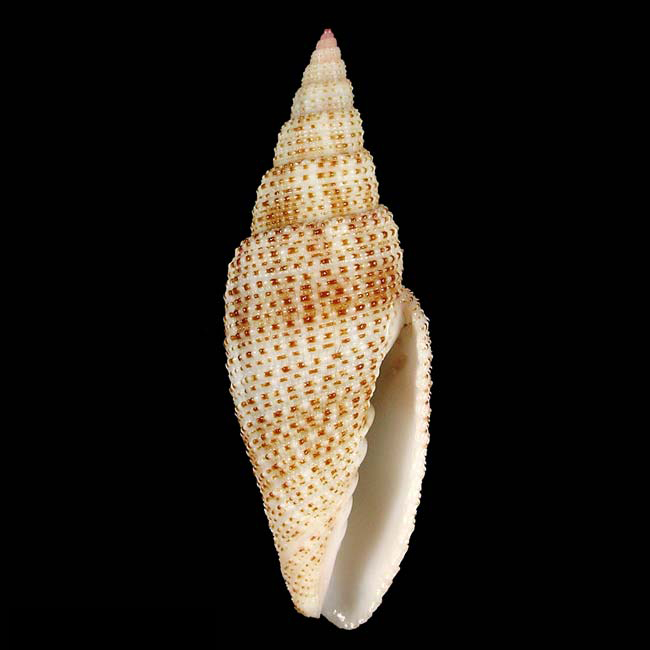
- Shell of Roseomitra millepunctata (neotype at MNHN, Paris)

Scientific classification
- Kingdom: Animalia
- Phylum: Mollusca
- Class: Gastropoda
- Subclass: Caenogastropoda
- Order: Neogastropoda
- Family: Mitridae
- Genus: Roseomitra
- Species: R. millepunctata

Binomial name
- Roseomitra millepunctata (G. B. Sowerby III, 1889)

Synonyms
- Mitra millepunctata G. B. Sowerby III, 1889; Mitra terryni Poppe, 2008

= Roseomitra millepunctata =

Species of gastropod

Roseomitra millepunctata is a species of sea snail, a marine gastropod mollusk in the family Mitridae, the miters or miter snails.

== Description ==
Members of the order Neogastropoda are mostly gonochoric and broadcast spawners. Embryos develop into planktonic trochophore larvae and later into juvenile veligers before becoming fully grown adults

The length of the shell attains 23 mm, its diameter 7 mm.

(Original description) The elongately-fusiform shell has a long, sharp spire nearly as long as the dorsal part of body whorl. The protoconch is wanting. The re are 8 remaining whorls, slightly convex, separated by a well-marked, slightly crenulated suture. The sculpture consists of spiral grooves, which are distinctly punctured, about 1 5 grooves on the body whorl and 4 intermediate rows of punctures in the interstices 3 to 6. Moreover there are very fine growth-striae, somewhat coarser, nearly groove-like at the punctures are visible under the lens. The whole shell is ivory-white, with a row of subsquare yellowish-brown spots below the suture, 8 in number on the body whorl. The majority of the punctured grooves, especially on the body whorl, is of the same colour. The aperture is much broken, probably narrow, the intact upper part is not very sharp and smooth. The columella is slightly curved, with 5 oblique plaits, its interior is white.

== Distribution ==
This species occurs in the Philippines and the Andaman Islands.
