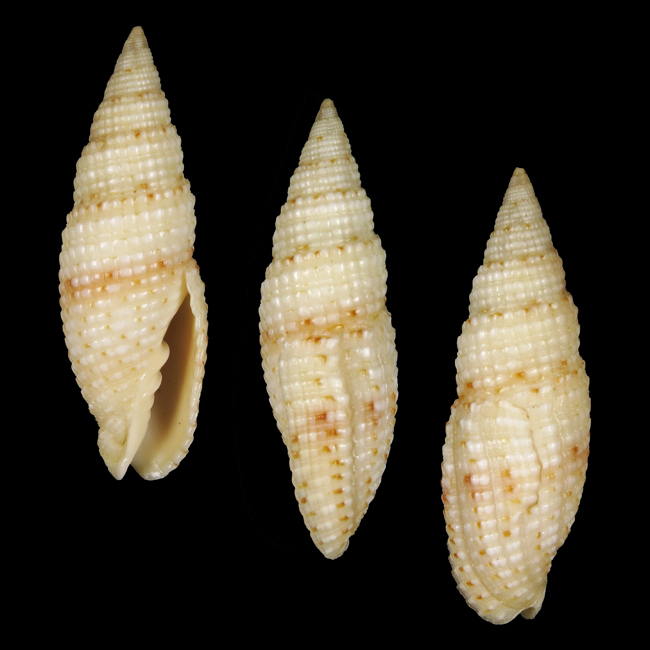

Scientific classification
- Kingdom: Animalia
- Phylum: Mollusca
- Class: Gastropoda
- Subclass: Caenogastropoda
- Order: Neogastropoda
- Family: Mitridae
- Genus: Neocancilla
- Species: N. hartorum

Binomial name
- Neocancilla hartorum Poppe, Salisbury & Tagaro, 2015

= Neocancilla hartorum =

Species of gastropod

Neocancilla hartorum is a species of sea snail, a marine gastropod mollusk in the family Mitridae.

== Description ==
The length of the shell attains 35.7 mm.

== Distribution ==
This marine species occurs off the Cook Islands.
