= Domiporta sigillata =

Scientific classification
- Kingdom: Animalia
- Phylum: Mollusca
- Class: Gastropoda
- Subclass: Caenogastropoda
- Order: Neogastropoda
- Family: Mitridae
- Genus: Domiporta
- Species: D. sigillata

Binomial name
- Domiporta sigillata (Azuma, 1965)

Synonyms
- Cancilla (Domiporta) sigillata (Azuma, 1965); Cancilla sigillata (Azuma, 1965); Mitra sigillata Azuma, 1965 (original combination)

Species of gastropod

Domiporta sigillata is a species of sea snail, a marine gastropod mollusc in the family Mitridae, the miters or miter snails.

== Description ==
The measured length of the shell is 21.8 mm.
