= Roseomitra rosacea =

Scientific classification
- Kingdom: Animalia
- Phylum: Mollusca
- Class: Gastropoda
- Subclass: Caenogastropoda
- Order: Neogastropoda
- Family: Mitridae
- Genus: Roseomitra
- Species: R. rosacea

Binomial name
- Roseomitra rosacea (Reeve, 1845)

Synonyms
- Mitra rosacea Reeve, 1845

Species of gastropod

Roseomitra rosacea is a species of sea snail, a marine gastropod mollusk in the family Mitridae, the miters or miter snails.
