= Neocancilla madagascariensis =

Scientific classification
- Kingdom: Animalia
- Phylum: Mollusca
- Class: Gastropoda
- Subclass: Caenogastropoda
- Order: Neogastropoda
- Superfamily: Mitroidea
- Family: Mitridae
- Subfamily: Imbricariinae
- Genus: Neocancilla
- Species: N. madagascariensis

Binomial name
- Neocancilla madagascariensis Herrmann, 2017

Species of gastropod

Neocancilla madagascariensis is a species of sea snail, a marine gastropod mollusk, in the family Mitridae, the miters or miter snails.

== Distribution ==
This species occurs in the following locations:

- Madagascar
- Maldives
- Mauritius
- Mozambique
- Sri Lanka
