= Neocancilla waikikiensis =

Scientific classification
- Kingdom: Animalia
- Phylum: Mollusca
- Class: Gastropoda
- Subclass: Caenogastropoda
- Order: Neogastropoda
- Family: Mitridae
- Genus: Neocancilla
- Species: N. waikikiensis

Binomial name
- Neocancilla waikikiensis (Pilsbry, 1921)

Species of gastropod

Neocancilla waikikiensis is a species of sea snail, a marine gastropod mollusk in the family Mitridae, the miters or miter snails.
