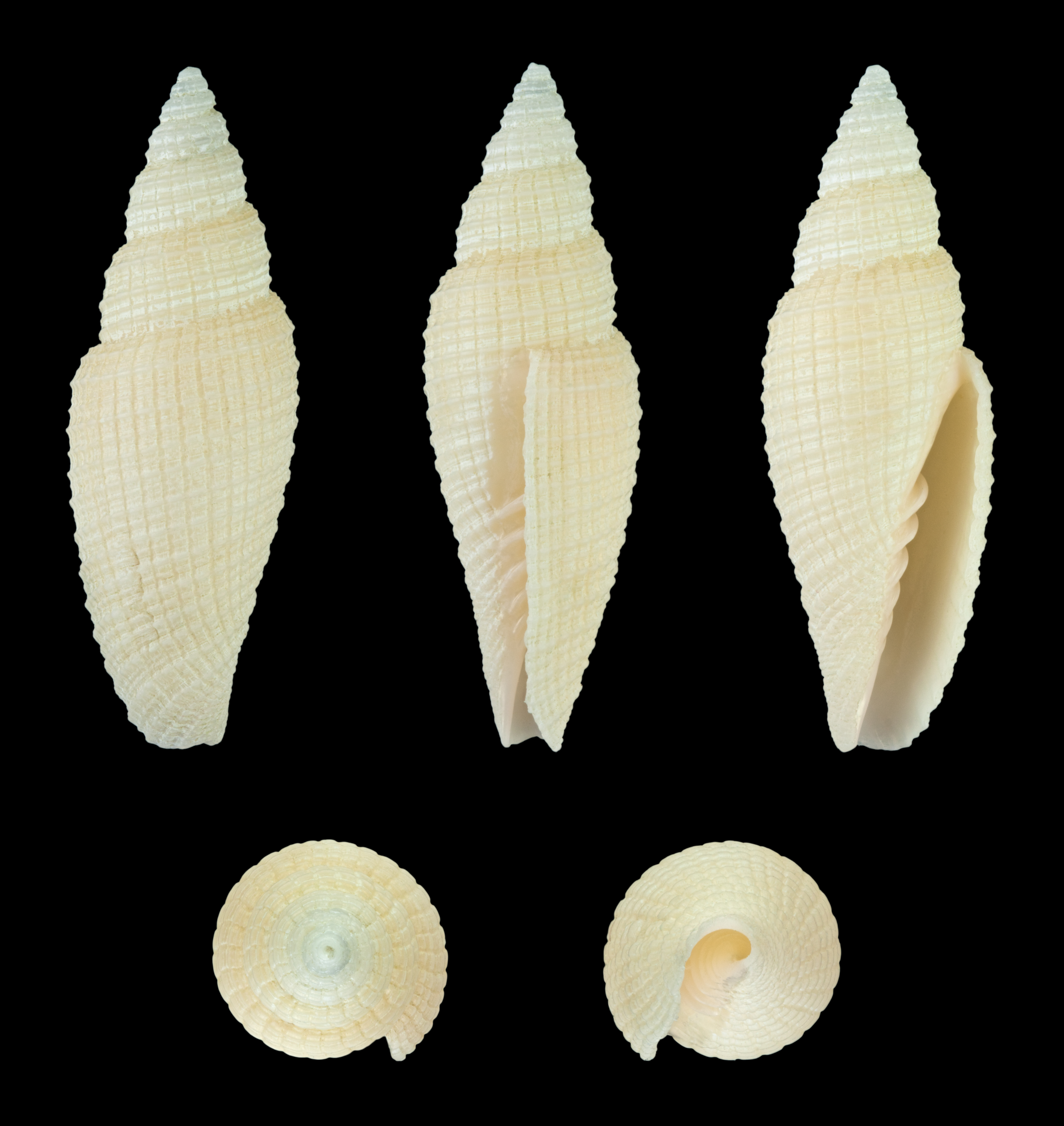

Scientific classification
- Kingdom: Animalia
- Phylum: Mollusca
- Class: Gastropoda
- Subclass: Caenogastropoda
- Order: Neogastropoda
- Superfamily: Mitroidea
- Family: Mitridae
- Subfamily: Mitrinae
- Genus: Roseomitra
- Species: R. incarnata

Binomial name
- Roseomitra incarnata (Reeve, 1845)

Synonyms
- Mitra incarnata Reeve, 1845

= Roseomitra incarnata =

Species of gastropod

Roseomitra incarnata is a species of sea snail, a marine gastropod mollusk, in the family Mitridae, the miters or miter snails.
