= Domiporta shikamai =

Scientific classification
- Kingdom: Animalia
- Phylum: Mollusca
- Class: Gastropoda
- Subclass: Caenogastropoda
- Order: Neogastropoda
- Family: Mitridae
- Genus: Domiporta
- Species: D. shikamai

Binomial name
- Domiporta shikamai Habe, 1980

Synonyms
- Cancilla (Domiporta) shikamai (Habe, 1980); Cancilla shikamai (Habe, 1980)

Species of gastropod

Domiporta shikamai is a species of sea snail, a marine gastropod mollusc in the family Mitridae, the miters or miter snails.
