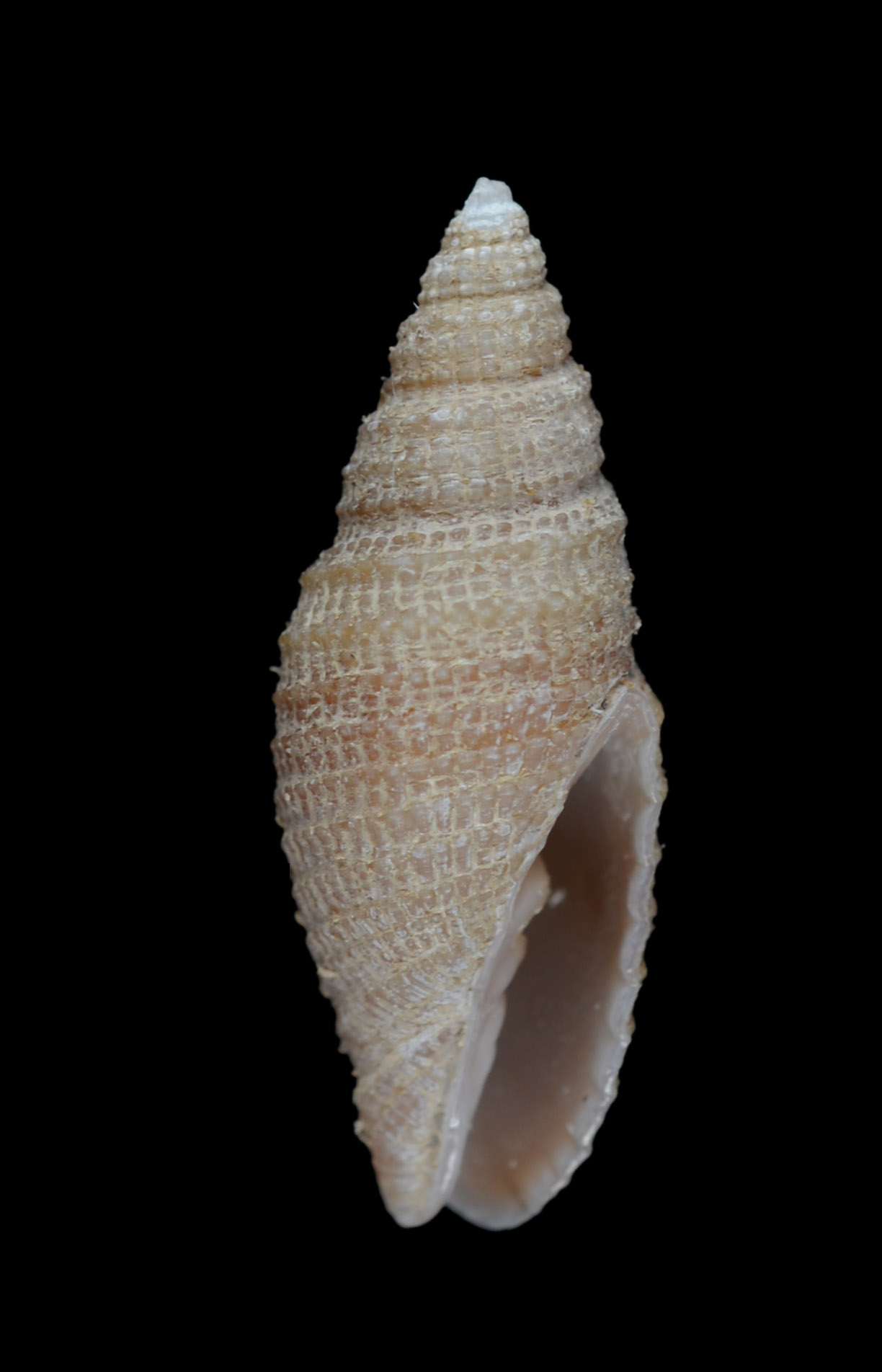
- Shell of Neocancilla rufescens (specimen at MNHN, Paris)

Scientific classification
- Kingdom: Animalia
- Phylum: Mollusca
- Class: Gastropoda
- Subclass: Caenogastropoda
- Order: Neogastropoda
- Superfamily: Mitroidea
- Family: Mitridae
- Subfamily: Imbricariinae
- Genus: Neocancilla
- Species: N. rufescens

Binomial name
- Neocancilla rufescens (A. Adams, 1853)

Synonyms
- Mitra rufescens A. Adams, 1853; Subcancilla rufescens (A. Adams, 1853)

= Neocancilla rufescens =

Species of gastropod

Neocancilla rufescens is a species of sea snail, a marine gastropod mollusk, in the family Mitridae, the miters or miter snails.

== Distribution ==
This marine species occurs off Mozambique.
