= Domiporta hebes =

Scientific classification
- Kingdom: Animalia
- Phylum: Mollusca
- Class: Gastropoda
- Subclass: Caenogastropoda
- Order: Neogastropoda
- Family: Mitridae
- Genus: Domiporta
- Species: D. hebes

Binomial name
- Domiporta hebes (Reeve, 1845)

Synonyms
- Mitra hebes Reeve, 1845; Neocancilla hebes (Reeve, 1845); Ziba carinata auct.non Swainson, W.A., 1824; Mitra asperulata Adams, A., 1853; Mitra (Nebularia) hamillei Petit de la Saussaye, S., 1871

Species of gastropod

Domiporta hebes is a species of sea snail, a marine gastropod mollusc in the family Mitridae, the miters or miter snails.

== Description ==
The shell size varies between 10 mm and 70 mm.

== Distribution ==
This species is distributed in the Atlantic Ocean along West Africa, Cape Verde and Gabon.
