= Domiporta daidaleosa =

Scientific classification
- Kingdom: Animalia
- Phylum: Mollusca
- Class: Gastropoda
- Subclass: Caenogastropoda
- Order: Neogastropoda
- Family: Mitridae
- Genus: Domiporta
- Species: D. daidaleosa

Binomial name
- Domiporta daidaleosa (Li, Zhang & Li, 2005)

Synonyms
- Neocancilla daidaleosa Li, Zhang & Li, 2005

Species of gastropod

Domiporta daidaleosa is a species of sea snail, a marine gastropod mollusk in the family Mitridae, the miters or miter snails.
