= Roseomitra roseovitta =

Scientific classification
- Kingdom: Animalia
- Phylum: Mollusca
- Class: Gastropoda
- Subclass: Caenogastropoda
- Order: Neogastropoda
- Superfamily: Mitroidea
- Family: Mitridae
- Subfamily: Mitrinae
- Genus: Roseomitra
- Species: R. roseovitta

Binomial name
- Roseomitra roseovitta (Huang, 2011)

Synonyms
- Domiporta roseovitta Huang, 2011

Species of gastropod

Roseomitra roseovitta is a species of sea snail, a marine gastropod mollusk, in the family Mitridae, the miters or miter snails.
