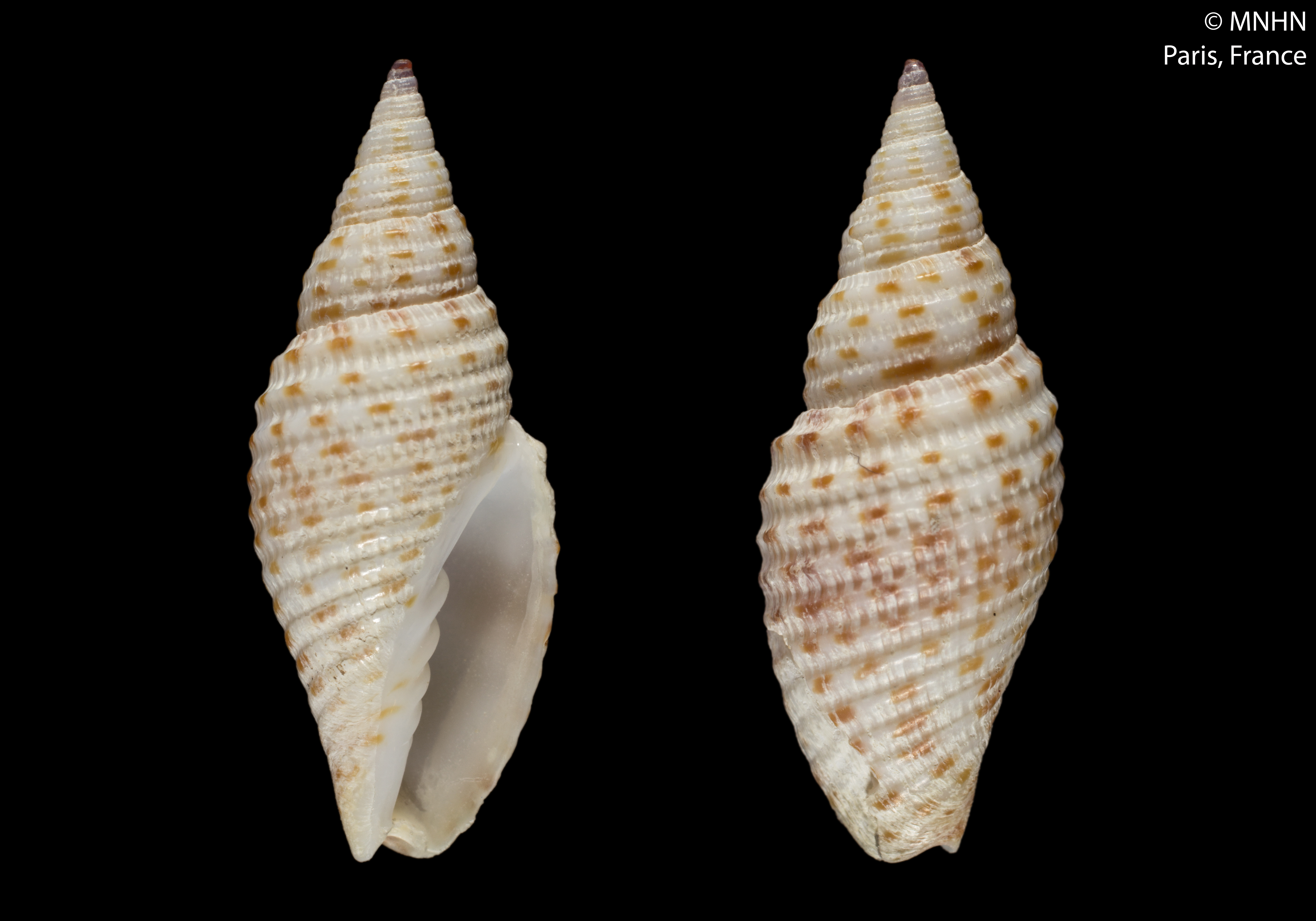
- Shell of Domiporta latistriata (holotype at MNHN, Paris)

Scientific classification
- Kingdom: Animalia
- Phylum: Mollusca
- Class: Gastropoda
- Subclass: Caenogastropoda
- Order: Neogastropoda
- Superfamily: Mitroidea
- Family: Mitridae
- Subfamily: Mitrinae
- Genus: Domiporta
- Species: D. latistriata

Binomial name
- Domiporta latistriata (Herrmann & Salisbury, 2012)

Synonyms
- Neocancilla latistriata Herrmann & Salisbury, 2012

= Domiporta latistriata =

Species of gastropod

Domiporta latistriata is a species of sea snail, a marine gastropod mollusk, in the family Mitridae, the miters or miter snails.

== Description ==
The length of the shell attains 21.7 mm.

== Distribution ==
This marine species occurs off the Marquesas Islands, French Polynesia.
