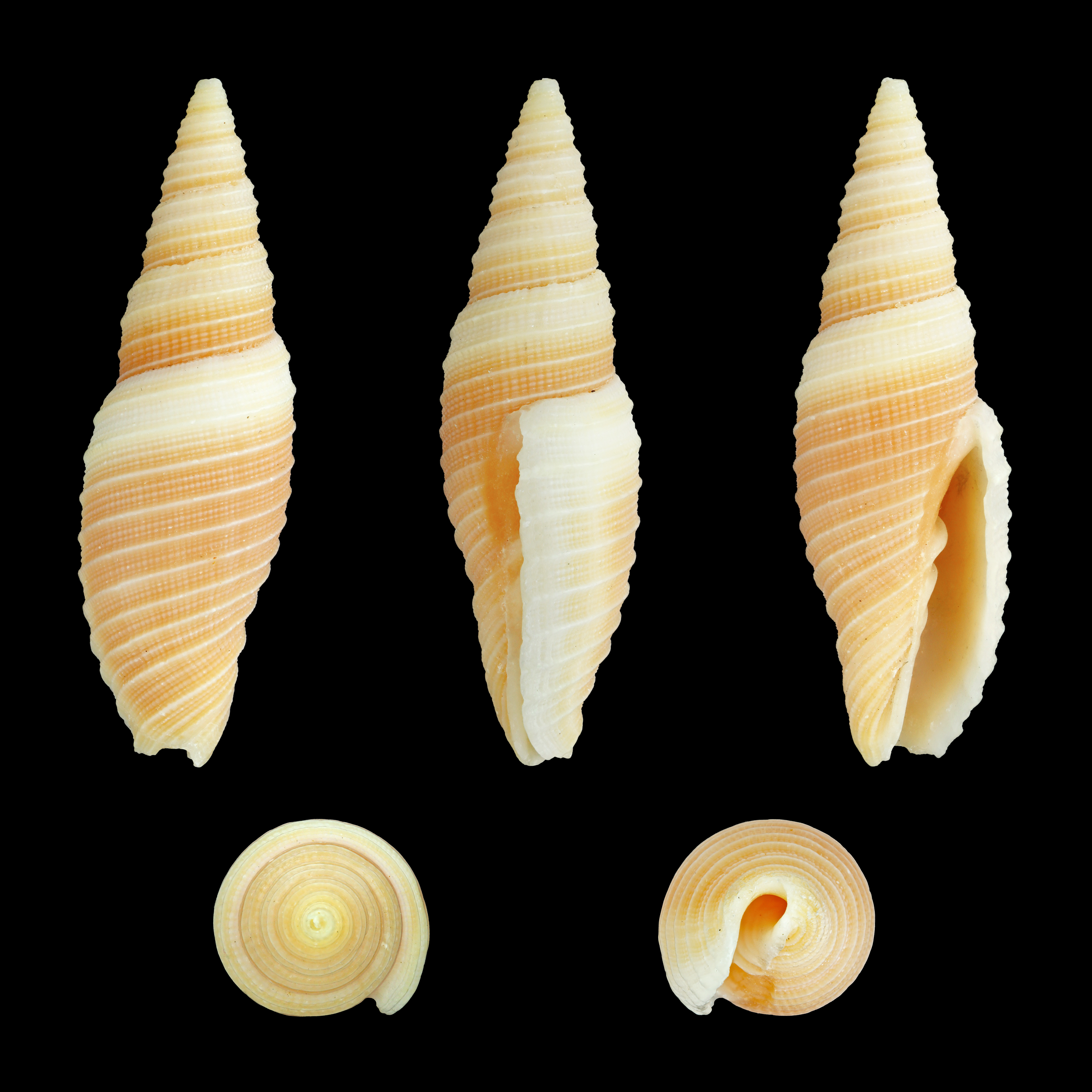

Scientific classification
- Kingdom: Animalia
- Phylum: Mollusca
- Class: Gastropoda
- Subclass: Caenogastropoda
- Order: Neogastropoda
- Family: Mitridae
- Genus: Domiporta
- Species: D. circula

Binomial name
- Domiporta circula (Kiener, 1838)

Synonyms
- Mitra circula Kiener, 1838; Neocancilla circula (Kiener, 1838); Subcancilla circula (Kiener, 1838)

= Domiporta circula =

Species of gastropod

Domiporta circula is a species of sea snail, a marine gastropod mollusk in the family Mitridae, the miters or miter snails. Their shell size ranges from 15 mm to 58 mm.

This species is distributed in the Red Sea and the Persian Gulf, the Indian Ocean along Madagascar, the Mascarene Basin and Mozambique; in the Pacific Ocean along Japan, Okinawa, the Philippines, Papua New Guinea, Tuamotus and Fiji
