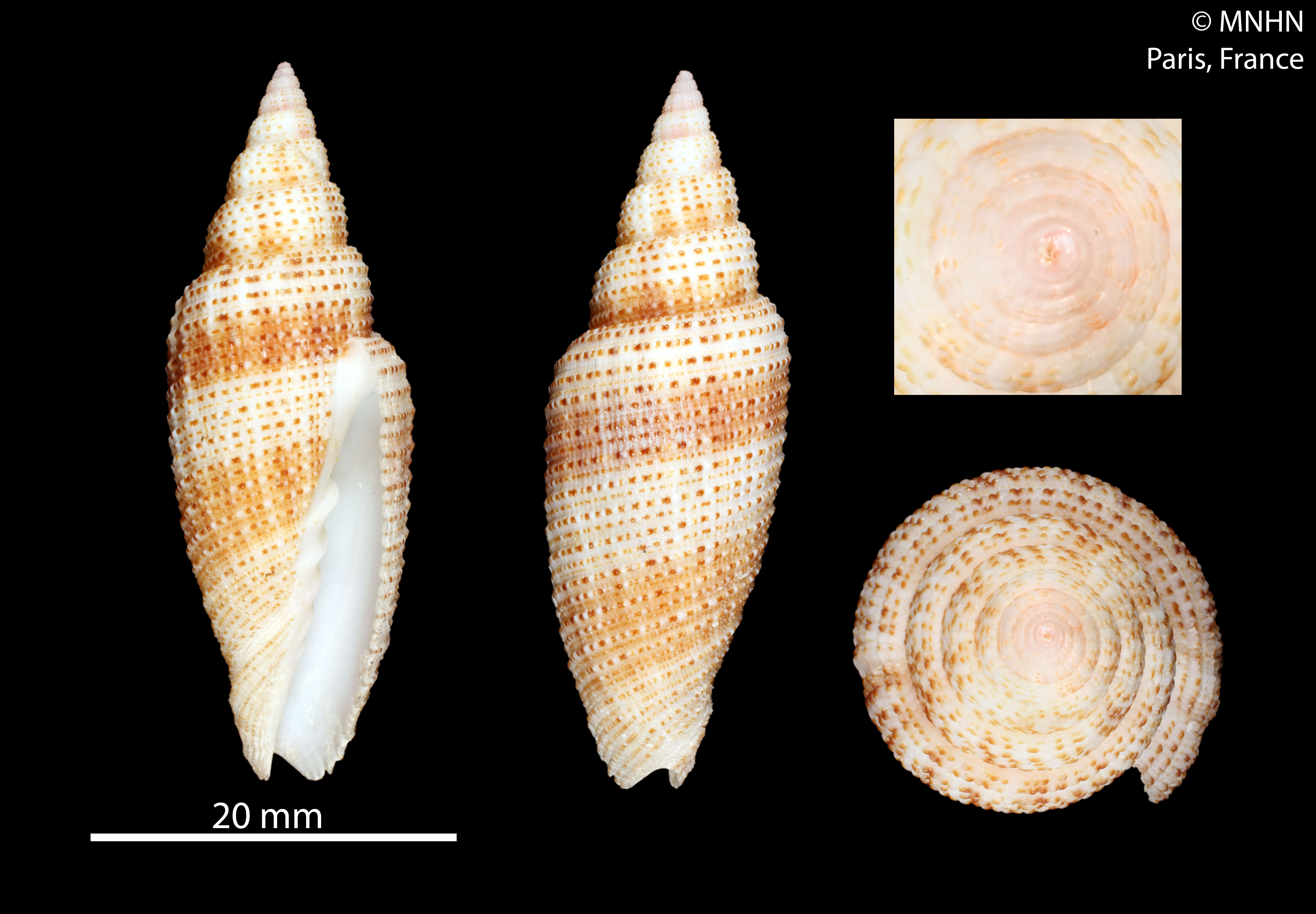
- Shell of Roseomitra millepunctata (paratype at MNHN, Paris)

Scientific classification
- Kingdom: Animalia
- Phylum: Mollusca
- Class: Gastropoda
- Subclass: Caenogastropoda
- Order: Neogastropoda
- Superfamily: Mitroidea
- Family: Mitridae
- Subfamily: Mitrinae
- Genus: Roseomitra; Fedosov, Herrmann, Kantor & Bouchet, 2018

Type species
- Mitra millepunctataG. B. Sowerby III, 1889

Species
- See text

= Roseomitra =

Genus of gastropods

Roseomitra is a genus of sea snails, marine gastropod mollusks in the subfamily Mitrinae of the family Mitridae.

== Species ==
Species within the genus Roseomitra include:

- Roseomitra citharoidea (Dohrn, 1862)
- Roseomitra earlei (Cernohorsky, 1977)
- Roseomitra fluctuosa (Herrmann & R. Salisbury, 2013)
- Roseomitra honkeri (Poppe, Tagaro & R. Salisbury, 2009)
- Roseomitra incarnata (Reeve, 1845)
- Roseomitra millepunctata (G. B. Sowerby III, 1889)
- Roseomitra reticulata (A. Adams, 1853)
- Roseomitra rosacea (Reeve, 1845)
- Roseomitra roseovitta (S.-I Huang, 2011)
- Roseomitra strangei (Angas, 1867)
- Roseomitra tagaroae (Poppe, 2008)
