= Roseomitra citharoidea =

Scientific classification
- Kingdom: Animalia
- Phylum: Mollusca
- Class: Gastropoda
- Subclass: Caenogastropoda
- Order: Neogastropoda
- Family: Mitridae
- Genus: Roseomitra
- Species: R. citharoidea

Binomial name
- Roseomitra citharoidea (Dohrn, 1862)

Synonyms
- Cancilla (Domiporta) citharoidea (Dohrn, 1862); Cancilla citharoidea (Dohrn, 1862); Domiporta citharoidea (Dohrn, 1862); Mitra citharoidea Dohrn, 1862 (original combination)

Species of gastropod

Roseomitra citharoidea is a species of sea snail, a marine gastropod mollusk in the family Mitridae, the miters or miter snails.
