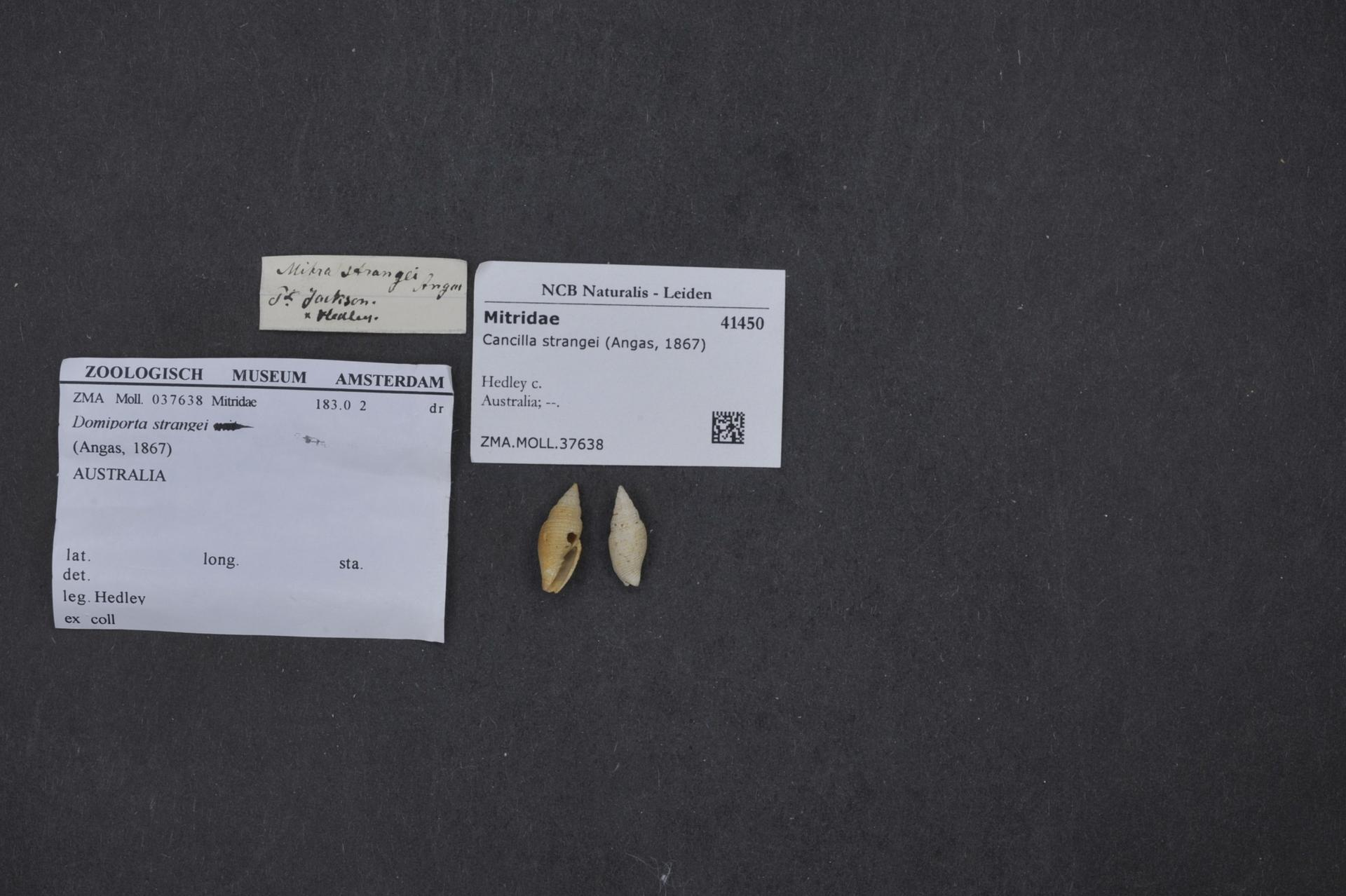
- Shell of Roseomitra strangei (specimen at Naturalis Biodiversity Center)

Scientific classification
- Kingdom: Animalia
- Phylum: Mollusca
- Class: Gastropoda
- Subclass: Caenogastropoda
- Order: Neogastropoda
- Family: Mitridae
- Genus: Roseomitra
- Species: R. strangei

Binomial name
- Roseomitra strangei (Angas, 1867)

Synonyms
- Cancilla (Domiporta) strangei (Angas, 1867); Cancilla strangei (Angas, 1867); Domiporta strangei (Angas, 1867); Mitra (Cancilla) strangei Angas, 1867 (basionym); Mitra franciscana Tenison Woods, 1877; Mitra nodostaminea Hedley, 1912; Mitra strangei Angas, 1867 (original combination); Mitra tasmantis Laseron, 1951

= Roseomitra strangei =

Species of gastropod

Roseomitra strangei is a species of sea snail, a marine gastropod mollusk in the family Mitridae, the miters or miter snails.

== Distribution ==
This marine species is endemic to New Zealand.
