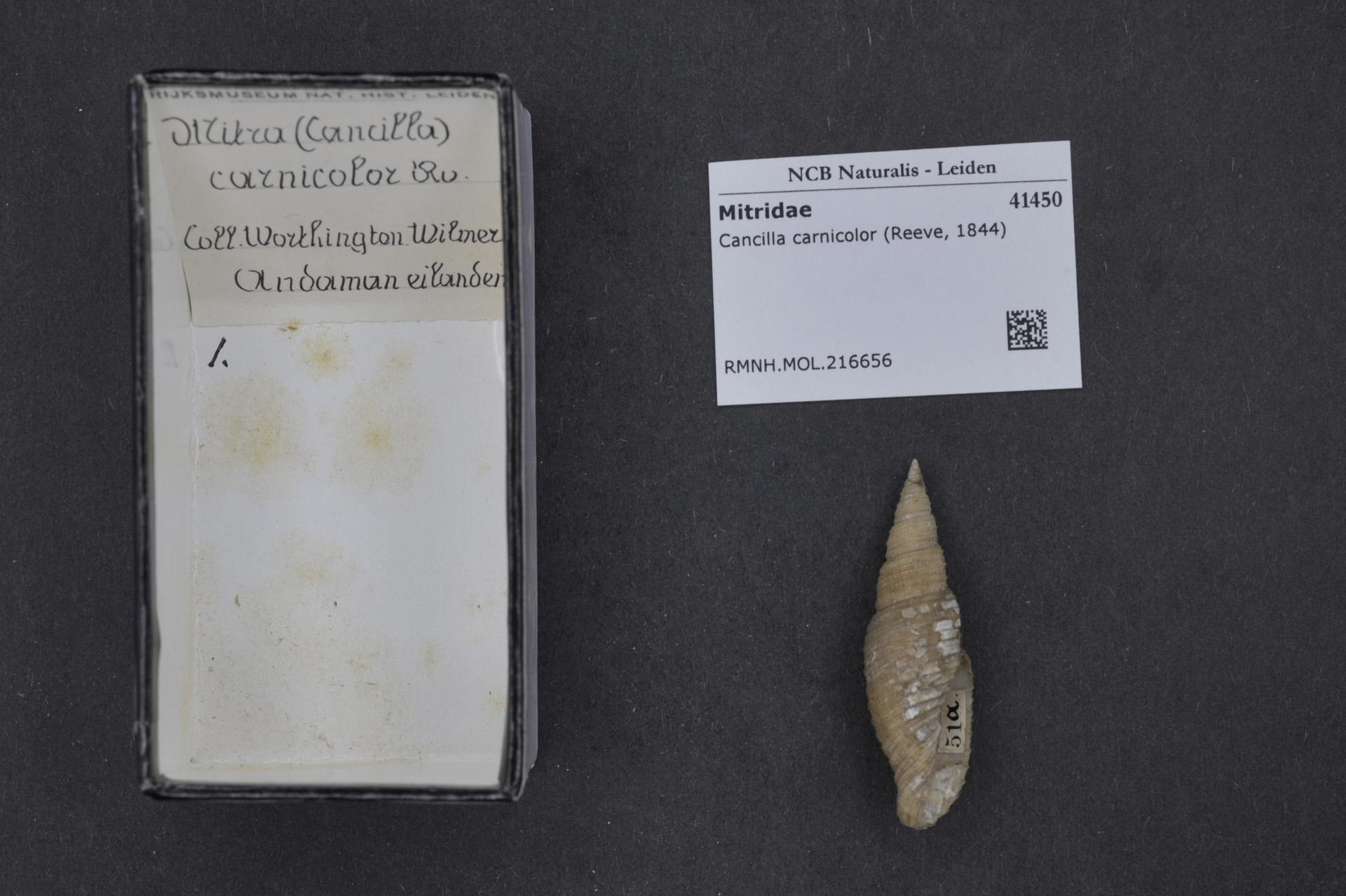
- Shell of Domiporta carnicolor (specimen at Naturalis Biodiversity Center)

Scientific classification
- Kingdom: Animalia
- Phylum: Mollusca
- Class: Gastropoda
- Subclass: Caenogastropoda
- Order: Neogastropoda
- Family: Mitridae
- Genus: Domiporta
- Species: D. carnicolor

Binomial name
- Domiporta carnicolor (Reeve, 1844)

Synonyms
- Cancilla (Domiporta) carnicolor (Reeve, 1844); Cancilla carnicolor (Reeve, 1844); Mitra carnicolor Reeve, 1844 (original combination)

= Domiporta carnicolor =

Species of gastropod

Domiporta carnicolor is a species of sea snail, a marine gastropod mollusc in the family Mitridae, the miters or miter snails.

== Distribution ==
This marine species occurs in the Red Sea and in the Indian Ocean off the Mascarene basin.
