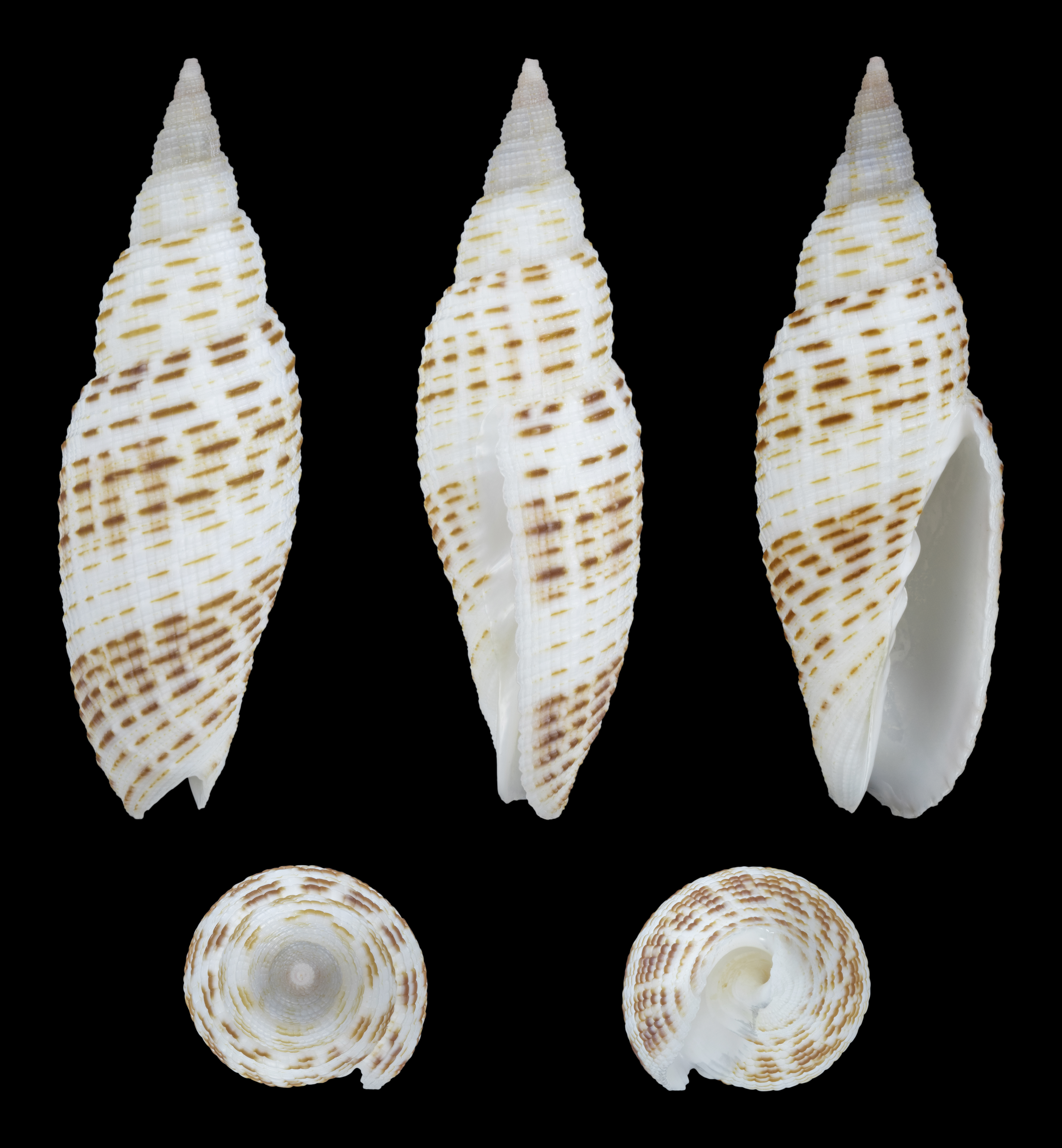
- Shell of Domiporta granatina

Scientific classification
- Kingdom: Animalia
- Phylum: Mollusca
- Class: Gastropoda
- Subclass: Caenogastropoda
- Order: Neogastropoda
- Family: Mitridae
- Genus: Domiporta
- Species: D. granatina

Binomial name
- Domiporta granatina (Lamarck, 1811)

Synonyms
- Cancilla (Domiporta) granatina (Lamarck, 1811); Cancilla granatina (Lamarck, 1811); Mitra granatina Lamarck, 1811 (original combination); Mitra (Scabricola) ehrenbergi Jickeli, 1874 (junior synonym); Neocancilla granatina (Lamarck, 1811); Scabricola granatina (Lamarck, 1811)

= Domiporta granatina =

Species of gastropod

Domiporta granatina is a species of sea snail, a marine gastropod mollusc in the family Mitridae, the miters or miter snails.

== Description ==
This species attains a size of 30–60 mm.

== Distribution ==
Pacific: Okinawa. This species also occurs in the Red Sea, Queensland, Australia, and in the Indian Ocean off Aldabra and the Mascarene Basin.

== Habitat ==
10–100 feet of water, on fine sand.
