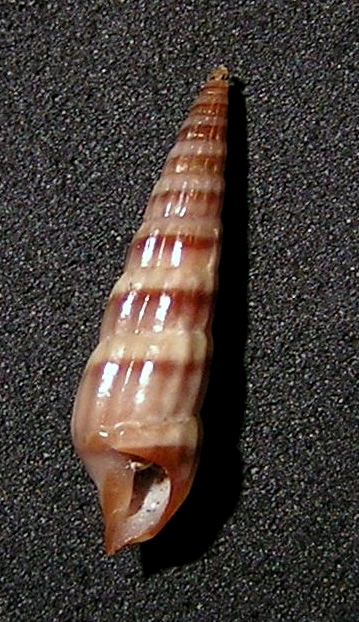
- Strioterebrum plumbeum

Scientific classification
- Kingdom: Animalia
- Phylum: Mollusca
- Class: Gastropoda
- Subclass: Caenogastropoda
- Order: Neogastropoda
- Superfamily: Conoidea
- Family: Terebridae
- Genus: †Strioterebrum; Sacco, 1891

Species
- See text.

Synonyms
- Terebra (Strioterebrum)

= Strioterebrum =

Extinct genus of gastropods

Strioterebrum is an extinct genus of sea snails, marine gastropod mollusks in the family Terebridae, the auger snails.

== Species ==
- † Strioterebrum acuminatum (Borson, 1820)

Species brought into synonymy

- Strioterebrum angelli J. Gibson-Smith & W. Gibson-Smith, 1984: synonym of Euterebra angelli (J. Gibson-Smith & W. Gibson-Smith, 1984)
- Strioterebrum arabellum (Thiele, 1925): synonym of Punctoterebra arabella (Thiele, 1925)
- Strioterebrum ballina (Hedley, 1915): synonym of Punctoterebra ballina (Hedley, 1915)
- Strioterebrum caliginosum (Deshayes, 1859): synonym of Punctoterebra caliginosa (Deshayes, 1859)
- Strioterebrum fuscotaeniatum (Thiele, 1925): synonym of Punctoterebra fuscotaeniata (Thiele, 1925)
- Strioterebrum grayi (E.A. Smith, 1877): synonym of Terebra grayi E. A. Smith, 1877
- Strioterebrum illustre Malcolm & Terryn, 2012: synonym of Punctoterebra illustris (Malcolm & Terryn, 2012)
- Strioterebrum isabella (Thiele, 1925): synonym of Punctoterebra isabella (Thiele, 1925)
- Strioterebrum japonicum (E.A. Smith, 1873): synonym of Punctoterebra japonica (E. A. Smith, 1873)
- Strioterebrum lividum (Reeve, 1860): synonym of Punctoterebra livida (Reeve, 1860)
- Strioterebrum nitidum (Hinds, 1844): synonym of Punctoterebra nitida (Hinds, 1844)
- Strioterebrum onslowensis Petuch, 1974: synonym of Terebra dislocata (Say, 1822)
- Strioterebrum paucincisum (Bratcher, 1988): synonym of Punctoterebra paucincisa (Bratcher, 1988)
- Strioterebrum pedroanum: synonym of Terebra pedroana Dall, 1908
- Strioterebrum plumbeum (Quoy & Gaimard, 1833): synonym of Punctoterebra plumbea (Quoy & Gaimard, 1833)
- Strioterebrum quadrispiralis (Weisbord, 1962): synonym of Euterebra angelli (J. Gibson-Smith & W. Gibson-Smith, 1984)
- Strioterebrum reticulare Pecchiolo in Sacco, 1891: synonym of Terebra reticularis (Pecchioli in Sacco, 1891)
- Strioterebrum sanjuanense (Pilsbry & Lowe, 1932): synonym of Neoterebra sanjuanensis (Pilsbry & H. N. Lowe, 1932)
- Strioterebrum sorrentense (Aubry, 1999): synonym of Gradaterebra sorrentensis (Aubry, 1999)
- Strioterebrum swainsoni (Deshayes, 1859): synonym of Punctoterebra swainsoni (Deshayes, 1859)
- Strioterebrum trispiralis (Weisbord, 1962): synonym of Euterebra angelli (J. Gibson-Smith & W. Gibson-Smith, 1984)
- Strioterebrum varia Bozzetti, 2008: synonym of Strioterebrum varium Bozzetti, 2008
- Strioterebrum weisbordi J. Gibson-Smith & W. Gibson-Smith, 1984: synonym of Terebra dislocata (Say, 1822)
- Strioterebrum wilkinsi Dance & Eames, 1966: synonym of Euterebra fuscobasis (E.A. Smith, 1877)
- Strioterebrum varia Bozzetti, 2008: synonym of Partecosta varia (Bozzetti, 2008)
- Strioterebrum varium Bozzetti, 2008: synonym of Partecosta varia (Bozzetti, 2008)
