= Baileyi =

Baileyi may refer to:

- Anostoma baileyi, a species of land snail
- Bulbophyllum baileyi, a species of orchid
- Gymnopilus baileyi, a species of mushroom
- Ivesia baileyi, a species in the rose family
- Mitromorpha baileyi, a species of sea snail
- Oliva baileyi, a species of sea snail
- Parnassius baileyi, a species of butterfly
- Xenospiza baileyi, the Sierra Madre sparrow

== See also ==
- C. baileyi (disambiguation)
- D. baileyi (disambiguation)
- E. baileyi (disambiguation)
- N. baileyi (disambiguation)
- T. baileyi (disambiguation)
