= S. japonica =

S. japonica may refer to:

- Saccharina japonica, the Dashi kombu, a marine brown alga species extensively cultivated in China, Japan and Korea
- Salix japonica, a willow species native to central Honshū in Japan
- Scopolia japonica, the Japanese belladonna, a flowering plant species
- Sillago japonica, the Japanese whiting, Japanese sillago or Shiro-gisu, a common coastal marine fish species found in Korea, China and Taiwan
- Skimmia japonica, a shrub species native to Japan
- Spiraea japonica, the Japanese spiraea, a plant species native to Japan, China and Korea
- Squatina japonica, the Japanese angelshark, a shark species found in the western Pacific from Japan, the Yellow Sea, Korea, northern China and the Philippines
- Stigmella japonica, a moth species only known from Hokkaido in Japan
- Strioterebrum japonica, a sea snail species
- Swertia japonica, a flowering plant species

== Synonyms ==
- Scilla japonica, a synonym for Barnardia japonica, a plant species
- Serissa japonica, a synonym for Serissa foetida, the snowrose, tree of a thousand stars or Japanese boxthorn, a flowering plant species native to India, China to Japan
- Sophora japonica, a synonym for Styphnolobium japonicum, the pagoda tree, a small tree or shrub species native to eastern Asia

== See also ==
- Japonica (disambiguation)
