= E. baileyi =

E. baileyi may refer to:

- Eriogonum baileyi, species of wild buckwheat
- Etheostoma baileyi, a fish species in the family Percidae

== See also ==
- Baileyi (disambiguation)
