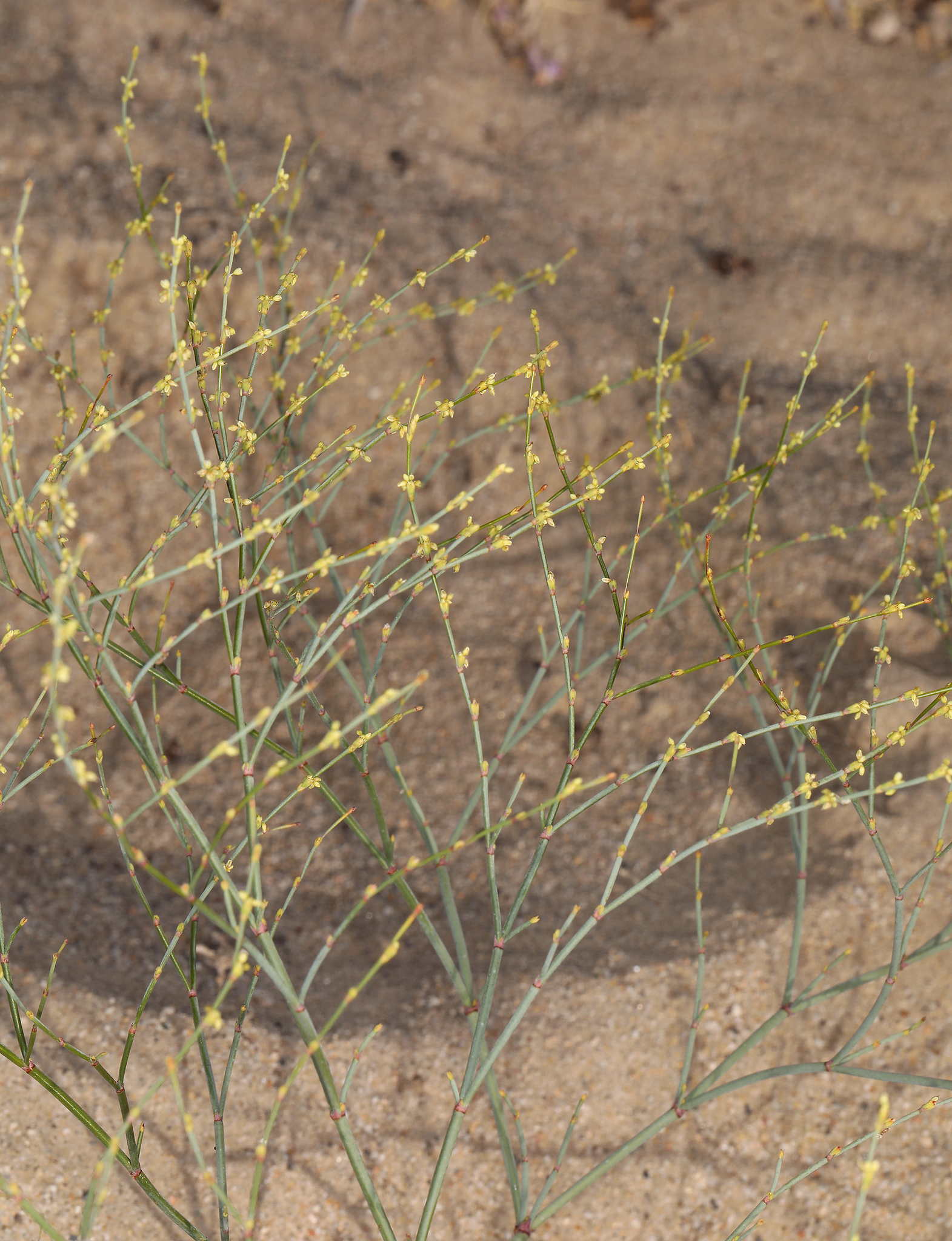

Conservation status
- Secure (NatureServe)

Scientific classification
- Kingdom: Plantae
- Clade: Embryophytes
- Clade: Tracheophytes
- Clade: Angiosperms
- Clade: Eudicots
- Order: Caryophyllales
- Family: Polygonaceae
- Genus: Eriogonum
- Species: E. brachyanthum

Binomial name
- Eriogonum brachyanthum Coville

= Eriogonum brachyanthum =

Species of wild buckwheat

Eriogonum brachyanthum is a species of wild buckwheat that is commonly known as shortflower buckwheat. It is native to eastern California and western Nevada, particularly the Mojave Desert region, where it is common to abundant, and even sometimes weedy. It is also known from southern Oregon. The plant grows in sandy habitats such as desert flats and sagebrush. It also grows in pinyon-juniper and montane conifer woodlands. It is an annual herb that grows 30 to 40 centimeters tall. Leaves are located at the base of the stem, woolly, and oval or rounded in shape. The top of the stem is occupied by a branching inflorescence bearing many widely spaced clusters of flowers. Each individual flower is about a millimeter wide and light yellow in color. Flowers bloom from April to November.

== Taxonomy ==
Eriogonum brachyanthum was scientifically described by Frederick Vernon Coville in 1893. It was subsequently described as a variety of Eriogonum baileyi in 1913 by Willis Linn Jepson and of Eriogonum vimineum in 1936 by Susan Gabriella Stokes. Its accepted classification is as a species in the Eriogonum genus in the Polygonaceae family.
