= D. baileyi =

D. baileyi may refer to:

- Dendropsophus baileyi, a species of frog
- Duplicaria baileyi, a species of sea snail

== See also ==
- Baileyi (disambiguation)
