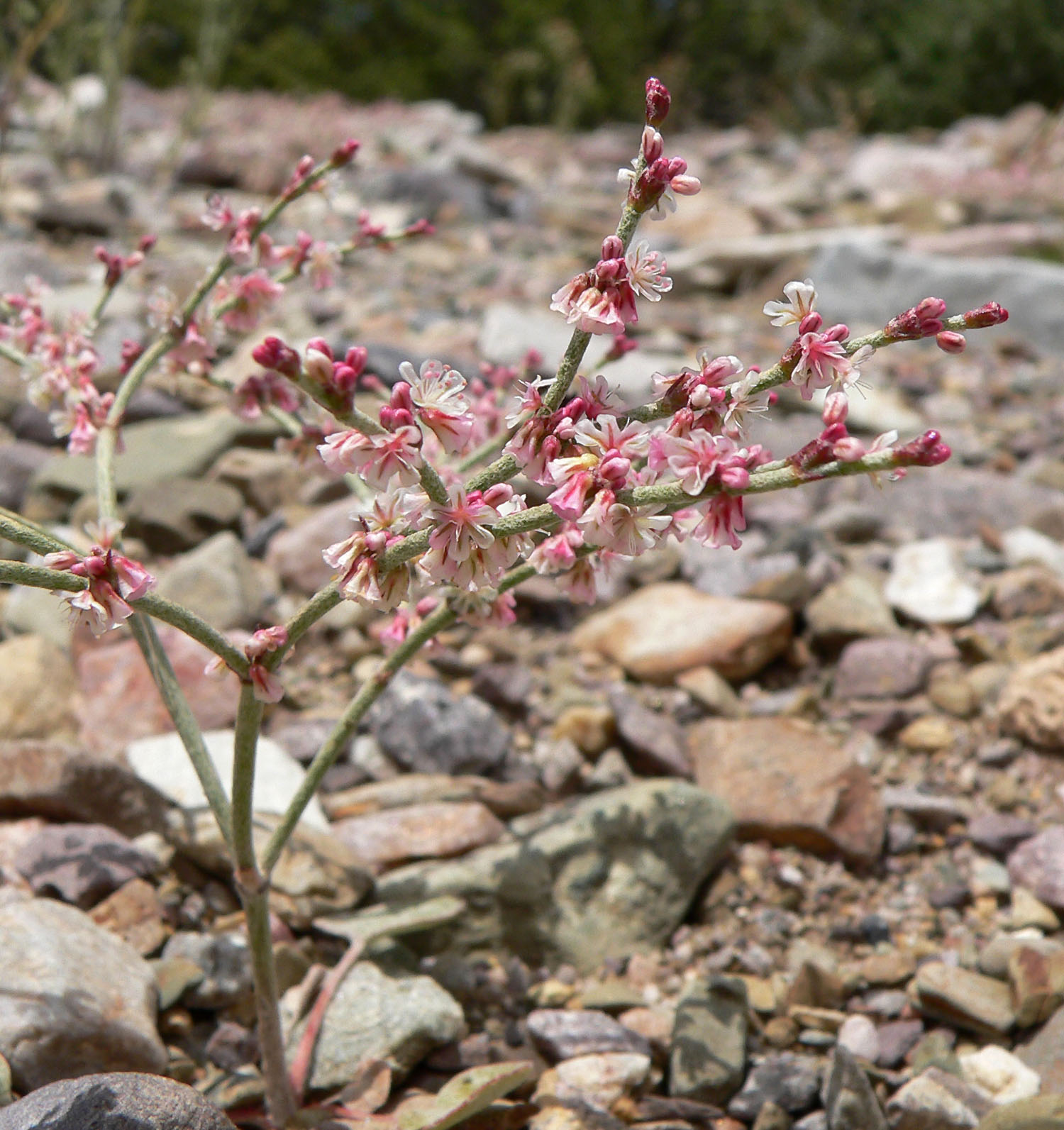

Conservation status
- Apparently Secure (NatureServe)

Scientific classification
- Kingdom: Plantae
- Clade: Embryophytes
- Clade: Tracheophytes
- Clade: Angiosperms
- Clade: Eudicots
- Order: Caryophyllales
- Family: Polygonaceae
- Genus: Eriogonum
- Species: E. palmerianum

Binomial name
- Eriogonum palmerianum Reveal

Synonyms
- Eriogonum baileyi var. tomentosum; Eriogonum plumatella var. palmeri

= Eriogonum palmerianum =

Species of wild buckwheat

Eriogonum palmerianum is a species of wild buckwheat known by the common name Palmer's buckwheat. It is native to the Southwestern region of the United States and Great Basin region, where it grows in many types of desert and sagebrush plateau habitat.

== Description ==
This is an annual herb producing an erect stem up to 30 centimeters tall which is coated in woolly fibers. The leaves are located around the base of the stem and are borne on short petioles.

The upper part of the stem spreads into an inflorescence lined with clusters of small white, yellow, or pink flowers.

== Taxonomy ==
In 1870 Asa Gray scientifically described a variety of Eriogonum plumatella which he named palmeri and attributed to John Torrey. In 1968 James L. Reveal reclassified it as a species, renaming it Eriogonum palmerianum. Along with the rest of the Eriogonum genus it is classified in the Polygonaceae family. It has one other heterotypic synonym, Eriogonum baileyi var. tomentosum published in 1877 by Sereno Watson.

== Range ==
Palmer's buckwheat native in the southwestern United States. In California it grows in just the south and eastern areas, but is widespread in Nevada. In Idaho it is only recorded in Owyhee County in the southwestern corner of the state, but it is found in most of both Utah and Arizona. In Colorado it is native to just two western counties, Mesa and Montezuma and similarly just Hidalgo and Grant counties in the southwestern New Mexico.
