= Curry Shop Shimizu =

Restaurant in Tokyo, Japan

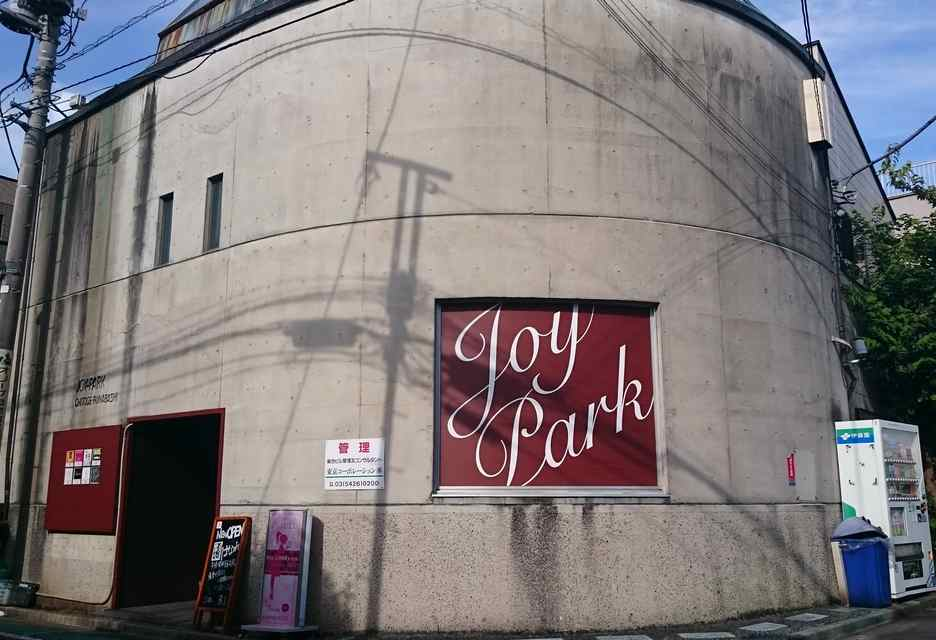
- Photo of the place where the restaurant opened in Tokyo
- Interactive map of Curry Shop Shimizu

Restaurant information
- Established: August 16, 2015
- Closed: January 4, 2016
- Manager: Hiroki Okada
- Chef: Ken Shimizu
- Location: Joypark Chitose Funabashi B1-A, 1-1-17, Setagaya-ku, Tokyo, Japan
- Coordinates: 35°38′54″N 139°37′29″E
- Seating capacity: 7 (counter); 3 (sofa)
- Website: curryshopshimizu.com

Curry Shop Shimizu (Japanese: カレーショップ志み津, Hepburn: Karēshoppu shimizu) was a restaurant in Tokyo. Owned by Japanese pornographic actor Ken Shimizu, it was infamous for serving feces-flavored curry.

== Overview ==
On August 16, 2015, Japanese porn actor Ken Shimizu, alongside Hiroki Okada, also known as Opanpon, who was the manager, opened the restaurant in Chitose-Funabashi, Setagaya-ku, Tokyo, as a joke restaurant. He said in an interview with weekly magazine SPA! that he loved feces since he was a child, and opened the restaurant because he wanted everyone to experience what feces tasted like. His inspiration was the feces-flavored curry he ate at an event.

The restaurant's only main dish was their feces-flavored curry. It is made from bitter melon, Japanese yam, onion, carrot, minced chicken, cocoa powder, and fish guts simmered in a curry powder blended with senburi tea. Shimizu said that the recipe was taken online, but he tweaked the recipe to make it more bitter. Despite the name, it does not contain any feces. It was served in bowls shaped like traditional Japanese toilets. The price ranged from ¥400 (2015) (US$3.3) to the large size costing ¥1,200 (2015) (US$9.91). The restaurant offered free senburi tea alongside water bottles that cost ¥1,000 (2015) (US$8.26), as well as free air freshener spray for guests when they leave.

The restaurant was closed on January 4, 2016. It was planned to be closed in October 2015, but due to the restaurant's popularity, its operation was extended until January 2016.

== Reception ==
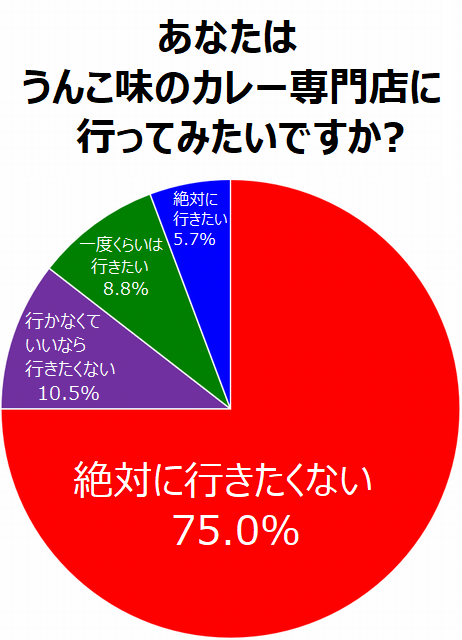
Top: Do you want to go to the poo-flavored curry shop? I do not want to go If I don't have to go, I don't want to go. I want to go one time. I really want to go

Before opening the restaurant, Shimizu and Okada conducted a survey among 400 adults and revealed that 80% do not want to set foot in the restaurant. According to Shimizu, 90% of the time, people will say that it is "bad".

Uehara Ai, a fellow pornographic actress, said that it was the "toughest task she'd encountered this year". The editorial team of Kai-You said that the curry tasted disgusting, adding that "the intense smell and strangely textured texture overwhelm your mouth".
