= C. baileyi =

C. baileyi may refer to:

- Callitris baileyi, a species of conifer
- Chaetodipus baileyi, or Bailey's pocket mouse
- Charaxes baileyi, a species of butterfly
- Conasprella baileyi, a species of sea snail
- Crenichthys baileyi, the White River springfish
- Crocidura baileyi, or Bailey's shrew

== See also ==
- Baileyi (disambiguation)
