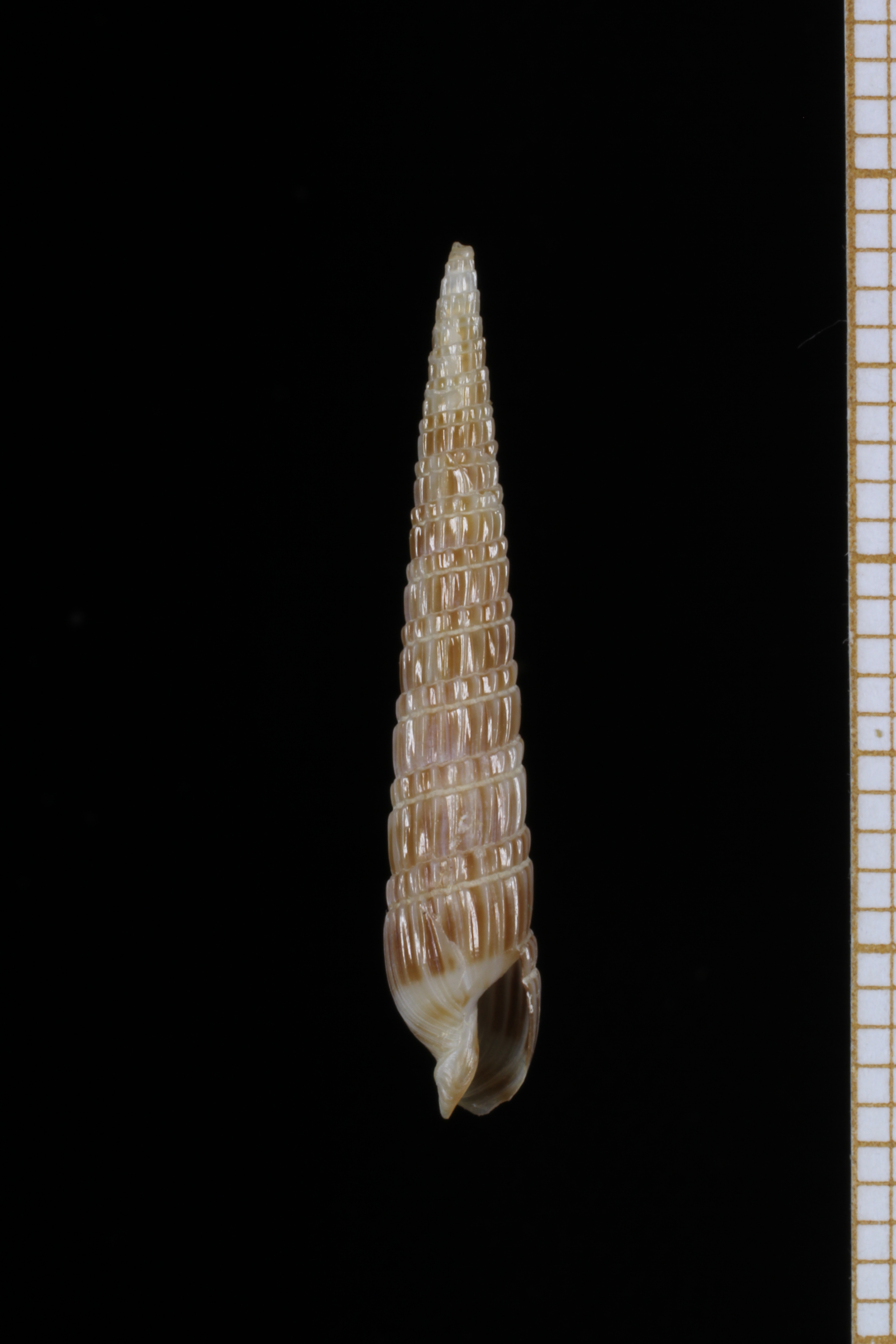
- Duplicaria teramachii (MNHN-IM-2013

Scientific classification
- Kingdom: Animalia
- Phylum: Mollusca
- Class: Gastropoda
- Subclass: Caenogastropoda
- Order: Neogastropoda
- Superfamily: Conoidea
- Family: Terebridae
- Genus: Punctoterebra
- Species: P. teramachii

Binomial name
- Punctoterebra teramachii (R.D. Burch, 1965)

Synonyms
- Duplicaria teramachii R. D. Burch, 1965 (original combination)

= Punctoterebra teramachii =

Species of gastropod

Punctoterebra teramachii is a species of sea snail, a marine gastropod mollusk in the family Terebridae, the auger snails.
