= T. baileyi =

T. baileyi may refer to:

- Tetraodon baileyi, the former name for Pao baileyi, a species of pufferfish
- Thermophis baileyi or Bailey's snake
- Tillandsia baileyi, a species of bromeliad

== See also ==
- Baileyi (disambiguation)
