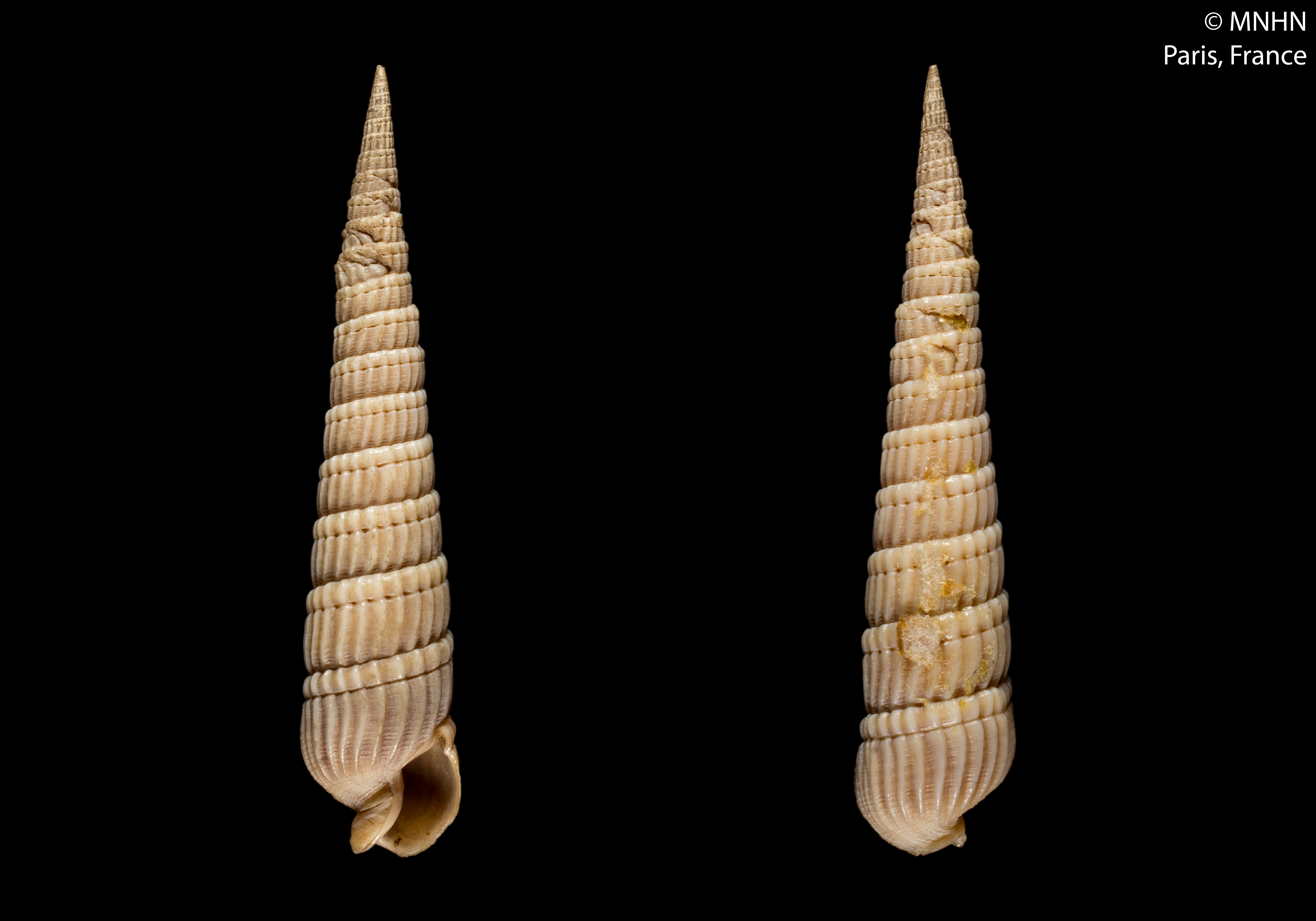
- Terebra textilis Hinds, 1844

Scientific classification
- Kingdom: Animalia
- Phylum: Mollusca
- Class: Gastropoda
- Subclass: Caenogastropoda
- Order: Neogastropoda
- Family: Terebridae
- Genus: Punctoterebra
- Species: P. textilis

Binomial name
- Punctoterebra textilis (Hinds, 1844)

Synonyms
- Myurella macgillivrayi Smith, 1873; Terebra exigua Deshayes, 1859; Terebra hizenensis 1Pilsbry, 1904; Terebra subtextilis Smith, 1879; Terebra textilis Hinds, 1844 (original combination)

= Punctoterebra textilis =

Species of gastropod

Punctoterebra textilis is a species of sea snail, a marine gastropod mollusk in the family Terebridae, the auger snails.
