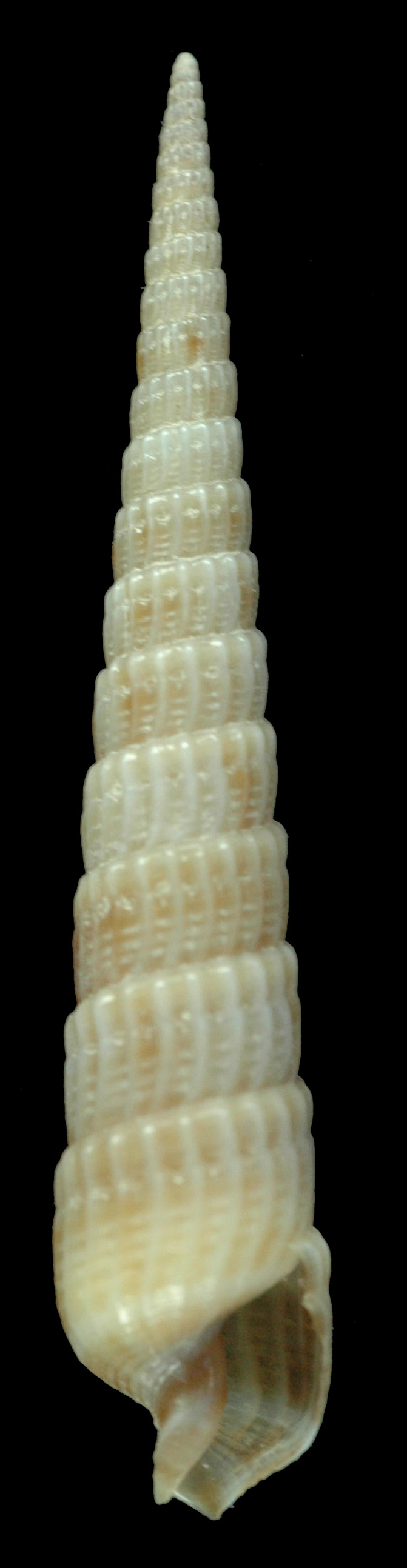
- Shell of Punctoterebra turrita

Scientific classification
- Kingdom: Animalia
- Phylum: Mollusca
- Class: Gastropoda
- Subclass: Caenogastropoda
- Order: Neogastropoda
- Superfamily: Conoidea
- Family: Terebridae
- Genus: Punctoterebra; Bartsch, 1923

Type species
- Terebra nitida Hinds, 1844

Synonyms
- Brevimyurella Oyama, 1961; Hastula (Punctoterebra) Bartsch, 1923; Terebra (Punctoterebra) Bartsch, 1923 (original rank)

= Punctoterebra =

Genus of gastropods

Punctoterebra is a genus of sea snails, marine gastropod mollusks in the subfamily Terebrinae of the family Terebridae, the auger snails.

== Species ==
- Punctoterebra ambrosia (Melvill, 1912)
- Punctoterebra arabella (Thiele, 1925)
- Punctoterebra aubryi (Gargiulo & Terryn, 2018)
- Punctoterebra awajiensis (Pilsbry, 1904)
- Punctoterebra baileyi (Bratcher & Cernohorsky, 1982)
- Punctoterebra ballina (Hedley, 1915)
- Punctoterebra caliginosa (Deshayes, 1859)
- Punctoterebra castaneofusca (Thiele, 1925)
- Punctoterebra contracta (E. A. Smith, 1873)
- Punctoterebra coralmarensis Terryn, 2021
- Punctoterebra exiguoides (Schepman, 1913)
- Punctoterebra fuscotaeniata (Thiele, 1925)
- Punctoterebra illustris (Malcolm & Terryn, 2012)
- Punctoterebra isabella (Thiele, 1925)
- Punctoterebra japonica (E. A. Smith, 1873)
- Punctoterebra lineaperlata (Terryn & Holford, 2008)
- Punctoterebra lischkeana (Dunker, 1877)
- Punctoterebra livida (Reeve, 1860)
- Punctoterebra longiscata (Deshayes, 1859)
- Punctoterebra marquesana Terryn, Gori & Rosado, 2019
- Punctoterebra nitida (Hinds, 1844)
- Punctoterebra omanensis (Gargiulo, 2018)
- Punctoterebra paucincisa (Bratcher, 1988)
- Punctoterebra pellyi (E. A. Smith, 1877)
- Punctoterebra plumbea (Quoy & Gaimard, 1833)
- Punctoterebra polygyrata (Deshayes, 1859)
- Punctoterebra reperta Terryn & Fraussen, 2020
- Punctoterebra rosacea (Pease, 1869)
- Punctoterebra roseata (A. Adams & Reeve, 1850)
- Punctoterebra solangeae (Bozzetti, 2015)
- Punctoterebra souleyeti (Deshayes, 1859)
- Punctoterebra succincta (Gmelin, 1791)
- Punctoterebra swainsoni (Deshayes, 1859)
- Punctoterebra teramachii (R. D. Burch, 1965)
- Punctoterebra textilis (Hinds, 1844)
- Punctoterebra tiurensis (Schepman, 1913)
- Punctoterebra trismacaria (Melvill, 1917)
- Punctoterebra turrita (E. A. Smith, 1873)
- Punctoterebra turschi (Bratcher, 1981)
- Punctoterebra venilia (Tenison Woods, 1879)
