= N. baileyi =

N. baileyi may refer to:

- Naemorhedus baileyi or red goral, a species of even-toed ungulate
- Notropsis baileyi or red Shiner, a species of freshwater fish
- Noturus baileyi or smoky madtom, a species of catfish

== See also ==
- Baileyi (disambiguation)
