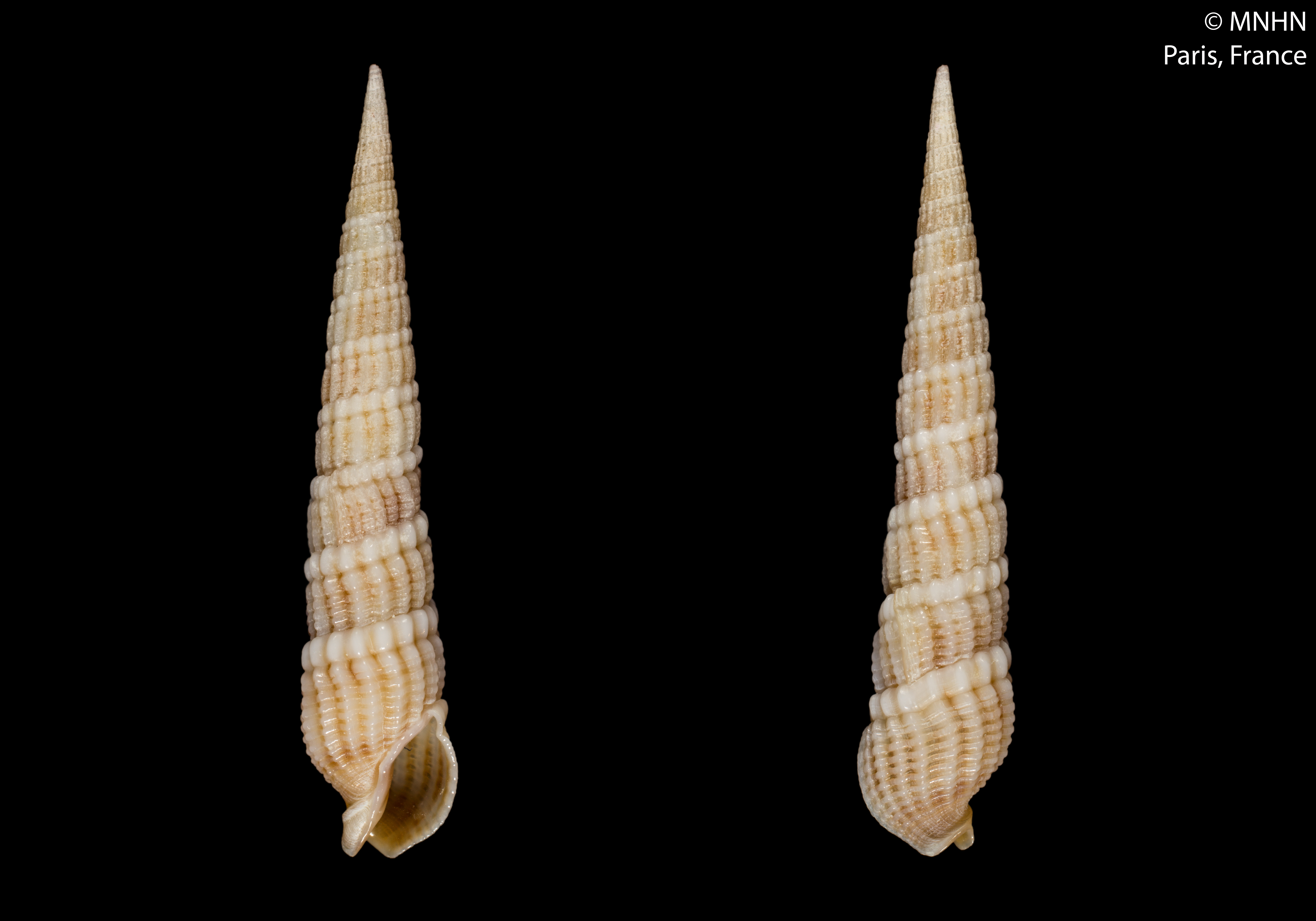
- Shell of Punctoterebra lineaperlata (holotype at MNHN, Paris)

Scientific classification
- Kingdom: Animalia
- Phylum: Mollusca
- Class: Gastropoda
- Subclass: Caenogastropoda
- Order: Neogastropoda
- Superfamily: Conoidea
- Family: Terebridae
- Genus: Punctoterebra
- Species: P. lineaperlata

Binomial name
- Punctoterebra lineaperlata (Terryn & Holford, 2008)

Synonyms
- Myurella lineaperlata Terryn & Holford, 2008 (original combination)

= Punctoterebra lineaperlata =

Species of gastropod

Punctoterebra lineaperlata is a species of sea snail, a marine gastropod mollusk in the family Terebridae, the auger snails.

== Description ==
The length of the shell is between 12 and 50 mm. Early teleoconch whorls often with angled profile, later ones flattened.

This species has flat marginal teeth, proboscis, radular sac and venom glands.

== Distribution ==
This marine species occurs off Vanuatu.
