= Ken Shimizu =

Japanese YouTuber, businessman, and former pornographic film actor (born 1979)

- 清水 健
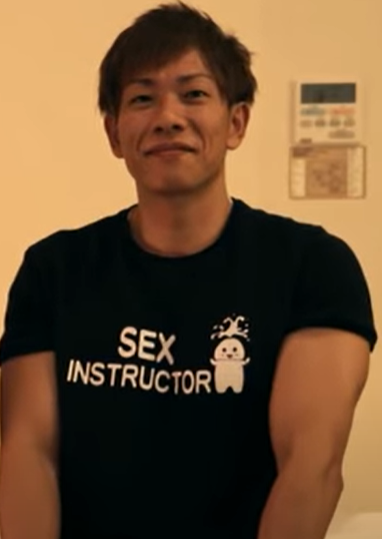
- Ken in 2019
- Born: September 1, 1979 (age 46); Chiba Prefecture, Japan
- Other names: ShimiKen (しみけん); Shim Ik-hyun; Shimi-kyung
- Occupations: Businessman; YouTuber; restauranteur
- Years active: 1998–present
- Height: 163 cm (5 ft 4 in)
- Spouse: Haruka Ito (m. 2018; div. 2022)
- Children: 3

Ken Shimizu (Japanese: 清水 健, Hepburn: Shimizu Ken; born September 1, 1979) is a Japanese YouTuber, businessman, restauranteur, and former pornographic film actor. Nicknamed Pornaldo and dubbed "the Cristiano Ronaldo of sex", he is credited with having sex with over 10,000 women in the course of making 10,000 films.

== Career ==
Born on September 1, 1979, and made his first appearance as a gravure model at 18 years old in the July 1998 issue of the Japanese gay men's magazine Buddy. His AV career began shortly afterward and by mid-2002 he was reported to have appeared in over 1,200 adult videos.

Another possible example of the Japanese AV industry's new interest in women viewers is shown in the 2008 Adult Video Grandprix contest where Shimizu's video Shimiken's Private 7 FUCK (しみけんのプライベート7FUCK) won the Best Miscellaneous Video award. The December 2007 video, produced by IdeaPocket and prominently displaying Shimizu clad only in briefs on the cover presents him having sex with seven AV idols: Chihiro Hara, Mangetsu Sakuragawa, Nene, Kaede Akina, Natsuki Sugisaki, Yua Aida and Marin. A second volume in the series, Shimiken's Private 7 FUCK 2 (しみけんのプライベート7FUCK 2), which also portrays his physique on the video box front cover, was released in August 2008.

On January 1, 2011, Shimizu changed his stage name to "ShimiKen" after receiving a phone call from his father telling him not to appear in adult videos under his real name.

In 2016, he opened a restaurant in Tokyo that served "poo-flavored curry".

In 2019, he was featured in an extensive interview published in The Chosun Ilbo. That same year, he launched a YouTube channel targeting Korean viewers called "ShimiKen TV". Since many Koreans found the name “ShimiKen” difficult to pronounce, he also adopted a Korean name, Shim Ik-hyun (also written as Shimi-kyung).

In October 2023, ShimiKen retired from being a pornographic actor, followed by the enactment of the AV Act for the Prevention and Relief of Victims of AV Appearances.

== Personal life ==
ShimiKen has been divorced twice and has two children from his first marriage and one child with his ex common-law wife voice actress Haruka Ito.
