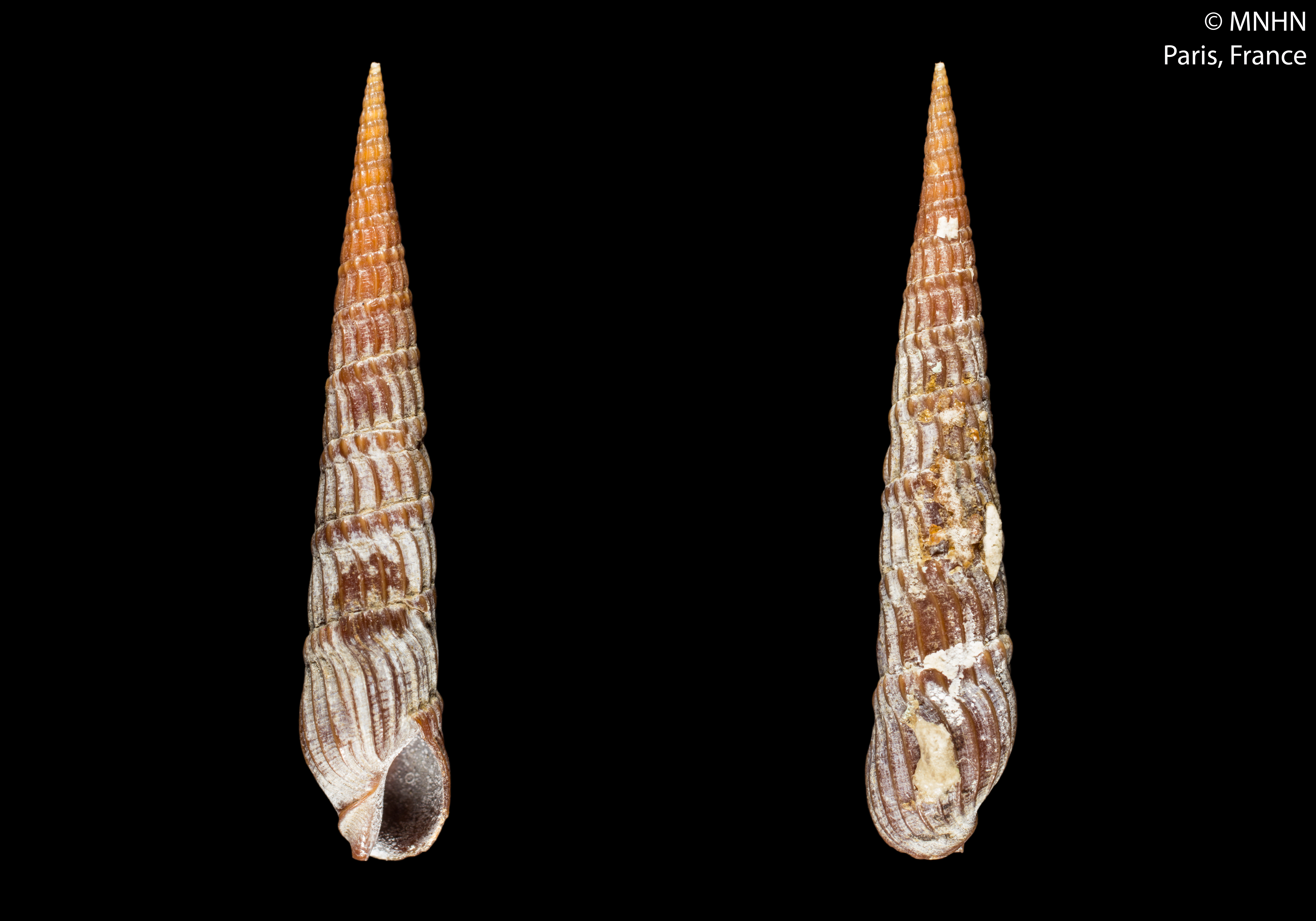
- Shell of Punctoterebra succincta (lectotype at MNHN, Paris)

Scientific classification
- Kingdom: Animalia
- Phylum: Mollusca
- Class: Gastropoda
- Subclass: Caenogastropoda
- Order: Neogastropoda
- Family: Terebridae
- Genus: Punctoterebra
- Species: P. succincta

Binomial name
- Punctoterebra succincta (Gmelin, 1791)

Synonyms
- Buccinum succinctum Gmelin, 1791; Epitonium fissum Röding, 1798; Terebra bermonti Lorois, 1857; Terebra cancellata (Gmelin, 1791); Terebra flavescens Deshayes, 1959; Terebra succincta (Gmelin, 1791); Terebra undatella Deshayes, 1859; Vertagus succinctus Link, 1807

= Punctoterebra succincta =

Species of gastropod

Punctoterebra succincta is a species of sea snail, a marine gastropod mollusk in the family Terebridae, the auger snails.
