= Punctoterebra trismacaria =

Scientific classification
- Kingdom: Animalia
- Phylum: Mollusca
- Class: Gastropoda
- Subclass: Caenogastropoda
- Order: Neogastropoda
- Superfamily: Conoidea
- Family: Terebridae
- Genus: Punctoterebra
- Species: P. trismacaria

Binomial name
- Punctoterebra trismacaria (Melvill, 1917)

Synonyms
- Terebra trismacaria Melvill, 1917 (original combination)

Species of gastropod

Punctoterebra trismacaria is a species of sea snail, a marine gastropod mollusk in the family Terebridae, the auger snails.
