= Punctoterebra tiurensis =

Scientific classification
- Kingdom: Animalia
- Phylum: Mollusca
- Class: Gastropoda
- Subclass: Caenogastropoda
- Order: Neogastropoda
- Family: Terebridae
- Genus: Punctoterebra
- Species: P. tiurensis

Binomial name
- Punctoterebra tiurensis (Schepman, 1913)

Synonyms
- Duplicaria tiurensis (Schepman, 1913); Terebra tiurensis Schepman, 1913

Species of gastropod

Punctoterebra tiurensis is a species of sea snail, a marine gastropod mollusk in the family Terebridae, the auger snails.
