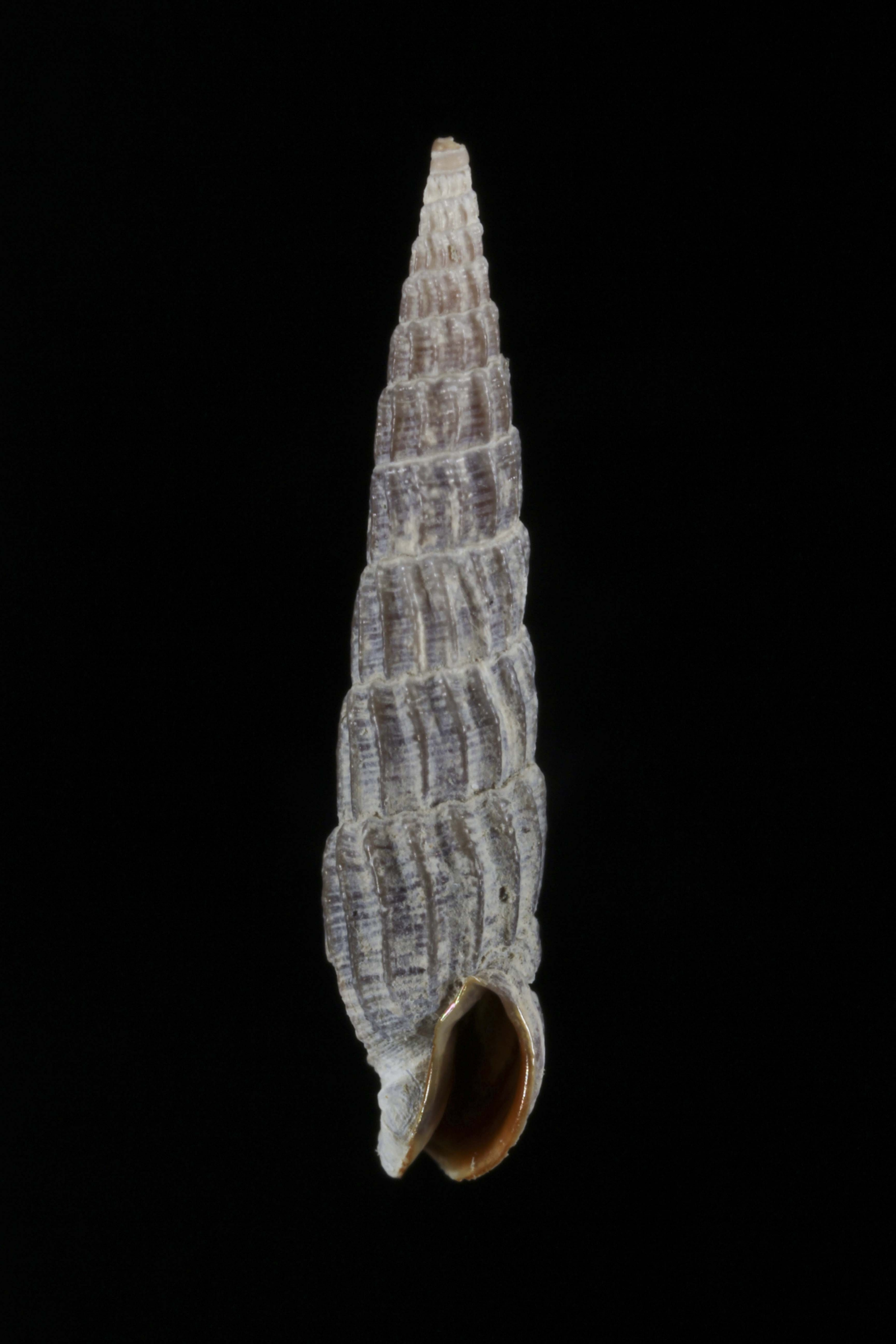
- Shell of Punctoterebra contracta (specimen at MNHN, Paris)

Scientific classification
- Kingdom: Animalia
- Phylum: Mollusca
- Class: Gastropoda
- Subclass: Caenogastropoda
- Order: Neogastropoda
- Family: Terebridae
- Genus: Punctoterebra
- Species: P. contracta

Binomial name
- Punctoterebra contracta (Smith, 1873)

Synonyms
- Myurella contracta Smith, 1873 (original combination); Terebra contracta (E. A. Smith, 1873)

= Punctoterebra contracta =

Species of gastropod

Punctoterebra contracta is a species of sea snail, a marine gastropod mollusk in the family Terebridae, the auger snails.

== Distribution ==
This marine species occurs off Papua New Guinea.
