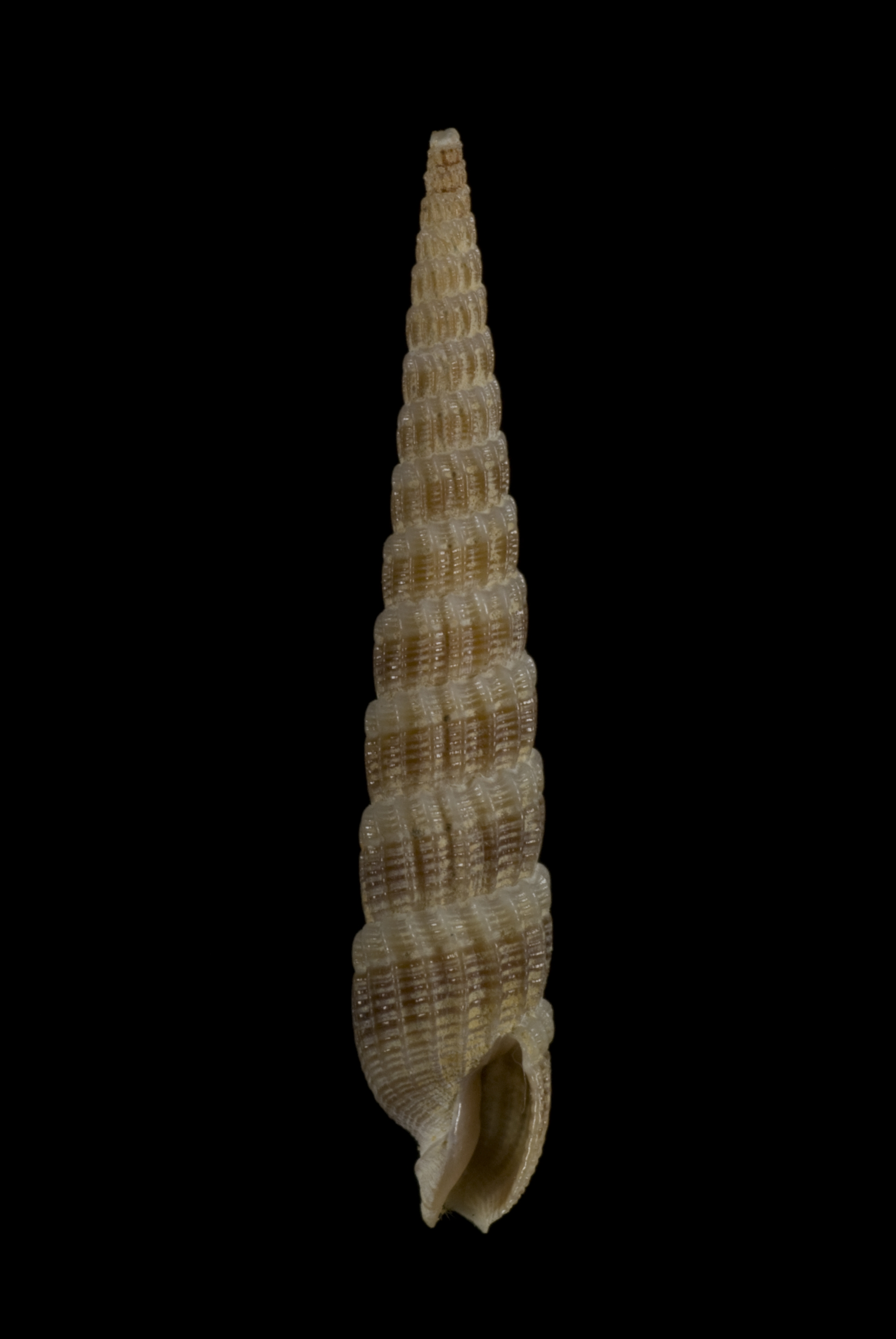
- Shell of Terebra polygyrata (specimen at MNHN, Paris)

Scientific classification
- Kingdom: Animalia
- Phylum: Mollusca
- Class: Gastropoda
- Subclass: Caenogastropoda
- Order: Neogastropoda
- Superfamily: Conoidea
- Family: Terebridae
- Genus: Punctoterebra
- Species: P. polygyrata

Binomial name
- Punctoterebra polygyrata Deshayes, 1859

Synonyms
- Terebra polygyrata Deshayes, 1859 (original combination)

= Punctoterebra polygyrata =

Species of gastropod

Punctoterebra polygyrata is a species of sea snail, a marine gastropod mollusk in the family Terebridae, the auger snails.

== Description ==
The length of the shell varies between 16 mm and 33 mm.

== Distribution ==
This marine species occurs off Papua New Guinea, off Mozambique, and off Iran.
