= Punctoterebra turschi =

Scientific classification
- Kingdom: Animalia
- Phylum: Mollusca
- Class: Gastropoda
- Subclass: Caenogastropoda
- Order: Neogastropoda
- Superfamily: Conoidea
- Family: Terebridae
- Genus: Punctoterebra
- Species: P. turschi

Binomial name
- Punctoterebra turschi (Bratcher, 1981)

Synonyms
- Terebra turschi Bratcher, 1981 (original combination)

Species of gastropod

Punctoterebra turschi is a species of sea snail, a marine gastropod mollusk in the family Terebridae, the auger snails.
