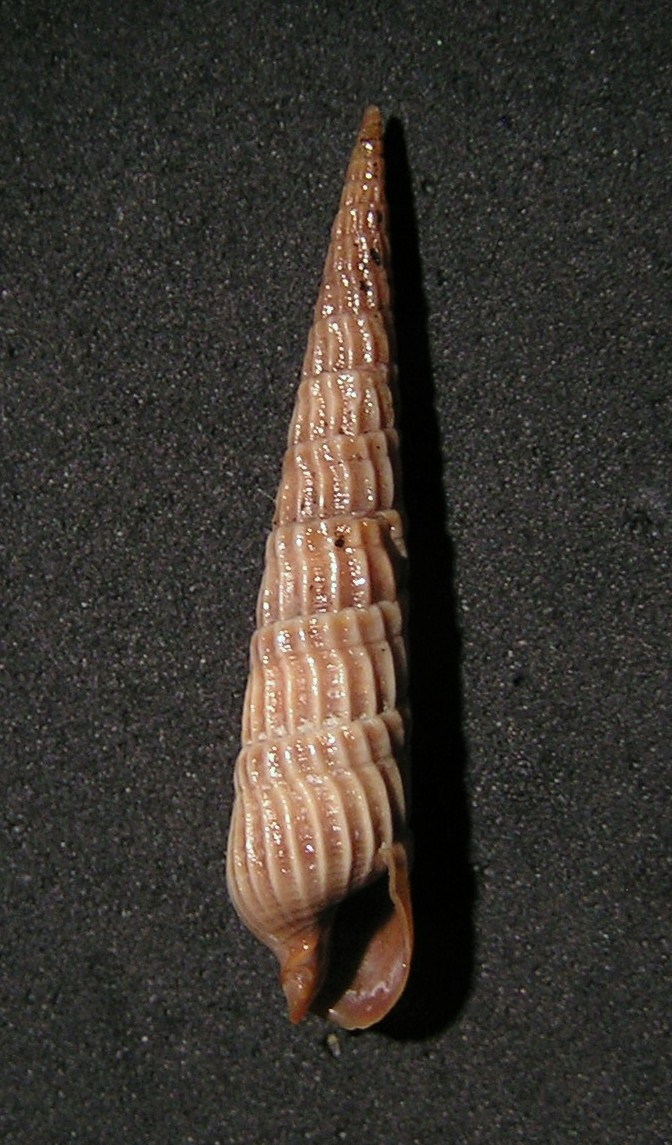
- Apertural view of a shell of Punctoterebra longiscata

Scientific classification
- Kingdom: Animalia
- Phylum: Mollusca
- Class: Gastropoda
- Subclass: Caenogastropoda
- Order: Neogastropoda
- Superfamily: Conoidea
- Family: Terebridae
- Genus: Punctoterebra
- Species: P. longiscata

Binomial name
- Punctoterebra longiscata (Deshayes, 1859)

Synonyms
- Terebra longiscata Deshayes, 1859 (original combination)

= Punctoterebra longiscata =

Species of gastropod

Punctoterebra longiscata is a species of sea snail, a marine gastropod mollusk in the family Terebridae, the auger snails.
