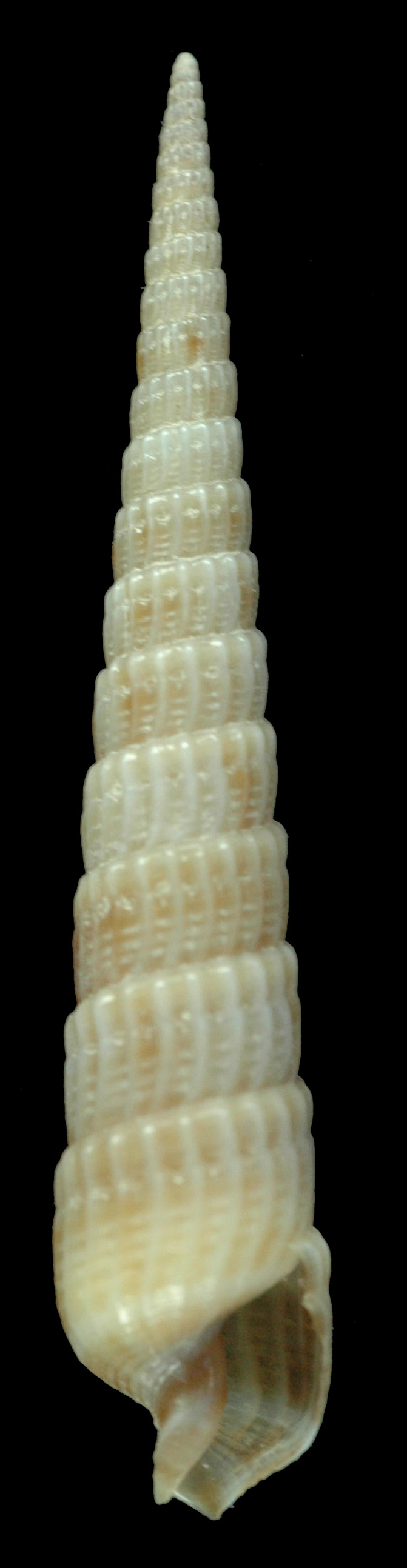
- Shell of Punctoterebra turrita (specimen at MNHN, Paris)

Scientific classification
- Kingdom: Animalia
- Phylum: Mollusca
- Class: Gastropoda
- Subclass: Caenogastropoda
- Order: Neogastropoda
- Superfamily: Conoidea
- Family: Terebridae
- Genus: Punctoterebra
- Species: P. turrita

Binomial name
- Punctoterebra turrita (E.A. Smith, 1873)

Synonyms
- Hastulopsis turrita (E. A. Smith, 1873); Myurella turrita E.A. Smith, 1873; Terebra turrita (E.A. Smith, 1873)

= Punctoterebra turrita =

Species of gastropod

Punctoterebra turrita is a species of sea snail, a marine gastropod mollusk in the family Terebridae, the auger snails.

== Distribution ==
This marine species occurs off Papua New Guinea.
