= Punctoterebra exiguoides =

Scientific classification
- Kingdom: Animalia
- Phylum: Mollusca
- Class: Gastropoda
- Subclass: Caenogastropoda
- Order: Neogastropoda
- Superfamily: Conoidea
- Family: Terebridae
- Genus: Punctoterebra
- Species: P. exiguoides

Binomial name
- Punctoterebra exiguoides (Schepman, 1913)

Synonyms
- Myurella exiguoides (Schepman, 1913); Terebra exiguoides Schepman, 1913 (original combination)

Species of gastropod

Punctoterebra exiguoides is a species of sea snail, a marine gastropod mollusk in the family Terebridae, the auger snails.
