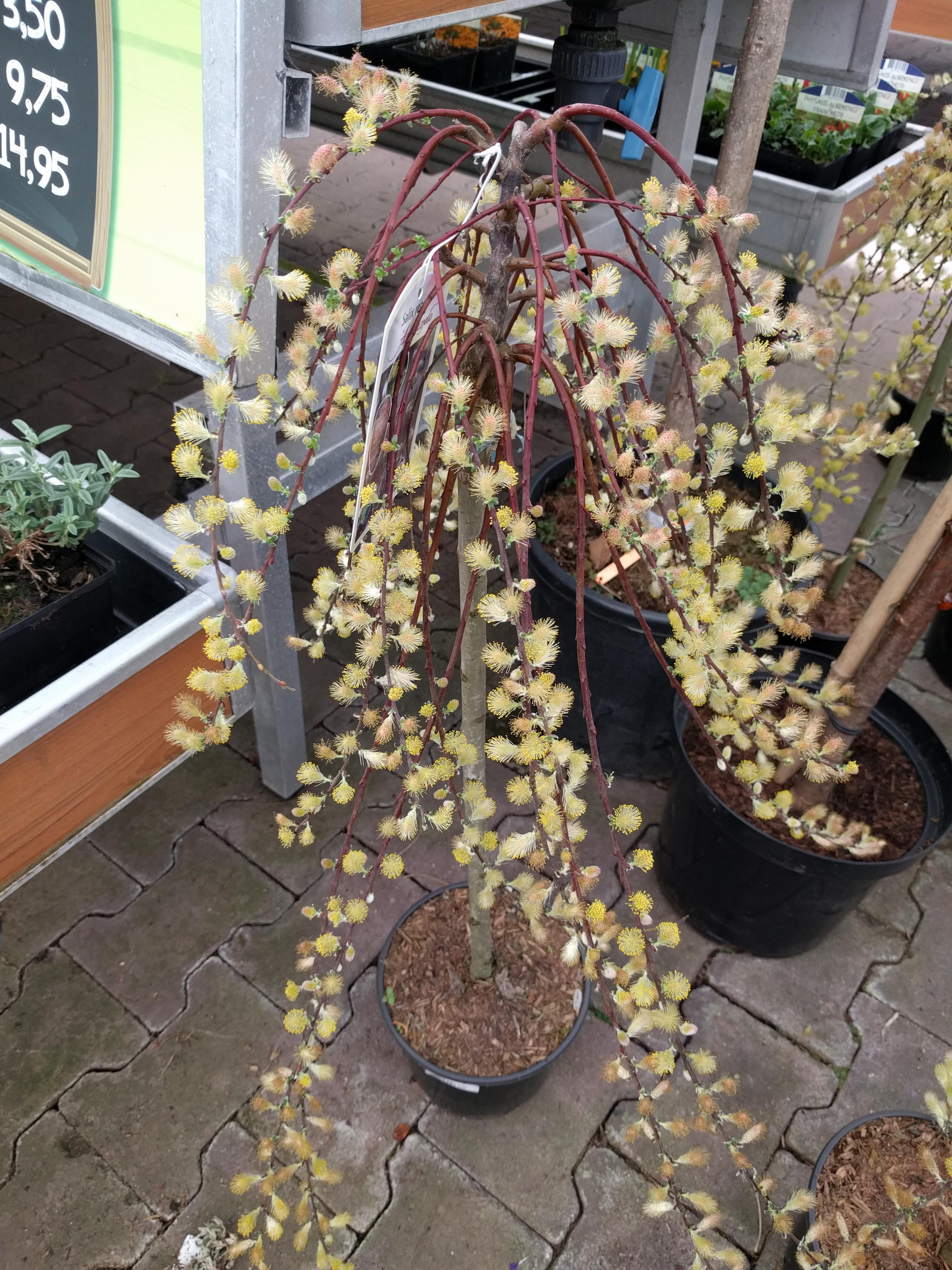

Scientific classification
- Kingdom: Plantae
- Clade: Tracheophytes
- Clade: Angiosperms
- Clade: Eudicots
- Clade: Rosids
- Order: Malpighiales
- Family: Salicaceae
- Genus: Salix
- Species: S. japonica

Binomial name
- Salix japonica Thunb.

= Salix japonica =

Species of willow

Salix japonica (Japanese: シバヤナギ, romanized: Shibayanagi) is a species of willow native to hills and mountains of central Honshū, Japan. It is a deciduous shrub, reaching a height of 2 m.
