= Punctoterebra livida =

Scientific classification
- Kingdom: Animalia
- Phylum: Mollusca
- Class: Gastropoda
- Subclass: Caenogastropoda
- Order: Neogastropoda
- Superfamily: Conoidea
- Family: Terebridae
- Genus: Punctoterebra
- Species: P. livida

Binomial name
- Punctoterebra livida (Reeve, 1860)

Synonyms
- Decorihastula livida (Reeve, 1860); Strioterebrum lividum (Reeve, 1860); Terebra livida Reeve, 1860 (original combination)

Species of gastropod

Punctoterebra livida is a species of sea snail, a marine gastropod mollusk in the family Terebridae, the auger snails.

== Description ==
The shell grows in an elongate or conical shape, up to a length of 40 mm. The head has two very short, close-set eye tentacles.

== Distribution ==
This species occurs in the Pacific Ocean off the Philippines and the Fiji Islands.
