= Punctoterebra ballina =

Scientific classification
- Kingdom: Animalia
- Phylum: Mollusca
- Class: Gastropoda
- Subclass: Caenogastropoda
- Order: Neogastropoda
- Superfamily: Conoidea
- Family: Terebridae
- Genus: Punctoterebra
- Species: P. ballina

Binomial name
- Punctoterebra ballina (Hedley, 1915)

Synonyms
- Duplicaria ballina Hedley, 1915; Strioterebrum ballina (Hedley, 1915); Terebra ballina (Hedley, 1915)

Species of gastropod

Punctoterebra ballina is a species of sea snail, a marine gastropod mollusk in the family Terebridae, the auger snails.

== Description ==
The size of an adult shell varies between 15 mm and 34 mm.

== Distribution ==
This marine species is distributed from Southern Queensland to New South Wales, Australia.
