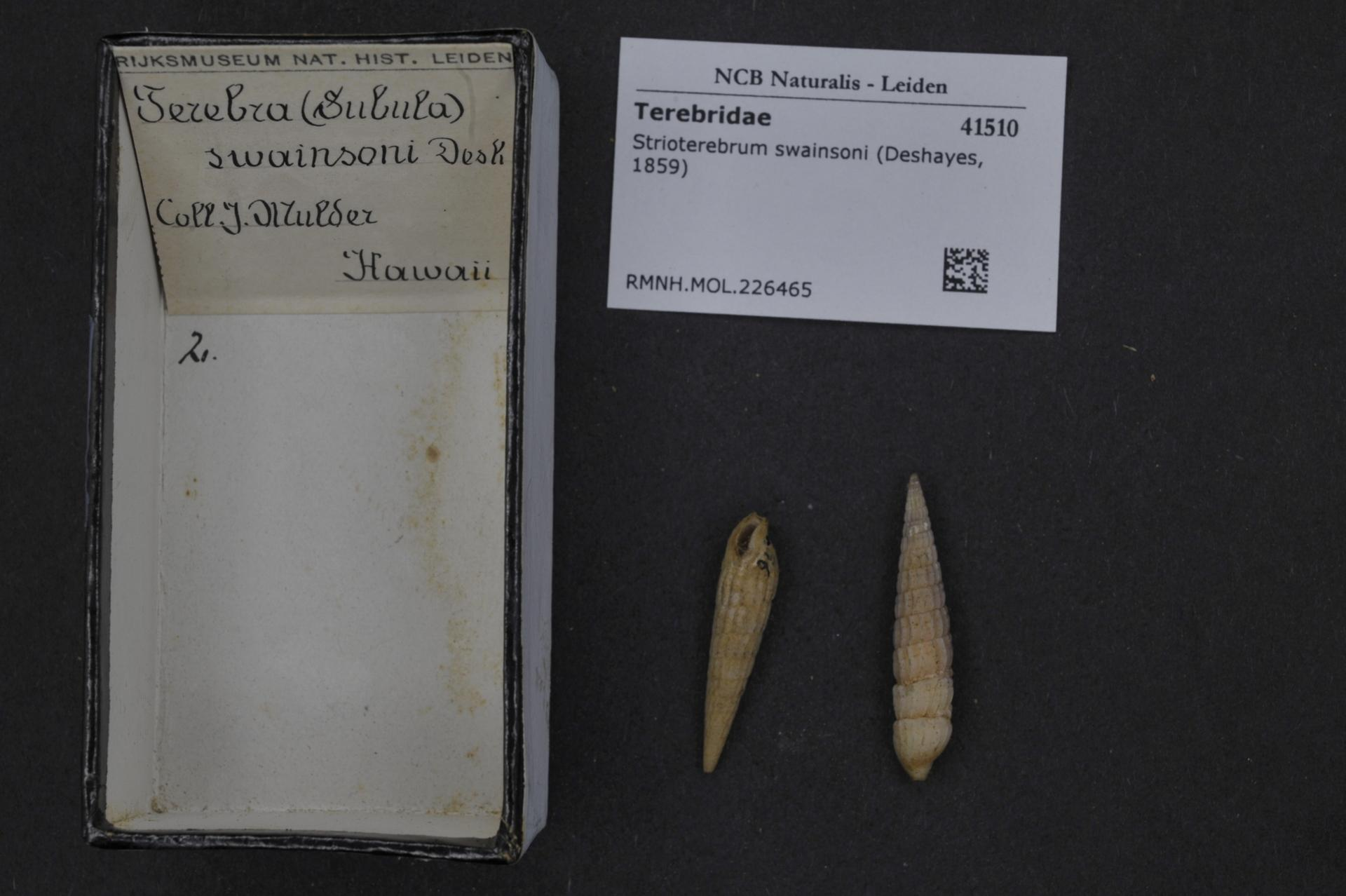

Scientific classification
- Kingdom: Animalia
- Phylum: Mollusca
- Class: Gastropoda
- Subclass: Caenogastropoda
- Order: Neogastropoda
- Family: Terebridae
- Genus: Punctoterebra
- Species: P. swainsoni

Binomial name
- Punctoterebra swainsoni (Deshayes, 1859)

Synonyms
- Strioterebrum swainsoni (Deshayes, 1859); Terebra inflexa Pease, 1869; Terebra inflexa alta Tinker, 1958; Terebra swainsoni Deshayes, 1859; Terebra swainsoni var. inflexa Pease, 1869

= Punctoterebra swainsoni =

Species of gastropod

Punctoterebra swainsoni, common name : Swainson's auger, is a species of sea snail, a marine gastropod mollusk in the family Terebridae, the auger snails.

== Description ==
The size of an adult shell varies between 10 mm and 54 mm. This mollusk can commonly be found as a sand dweller in the state of Hawaii

== Distribution ==
This species occurs in the Indian Ocean off South Africa and in the Pacific Ocean along Hawaii and Tahiti.
