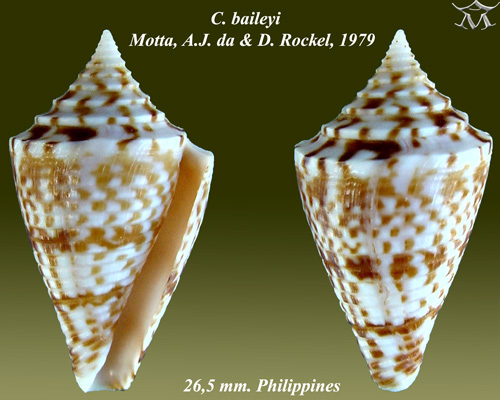
- Apertural and abapertural views of shell of Conasprella baileyi (Motta, A.J. da & D. Rockel, 1979)
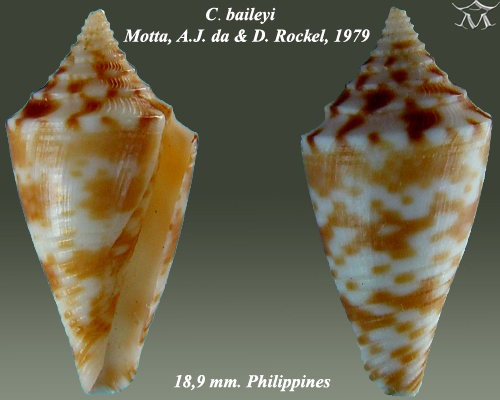

Conservation status
- Least Concern (IUCN 3.1)

Scientific classification
- Kingdom: Animalia
- Phylum: Mollusca
- Class: Gastropoda
- Subclass: Caenogastropoda
- Order: Neogastropoda
- Superfamily: Conoidea
- Family: Conidae
- Genus: Conasprella
- Species: C. baileyi

Binomial name
- Conasprella baileyi (Röckel & da Motta, 1979)

Synonyms
- Conasprella (Conasprella) baileyi (Röckel & da Motta, 1979) · accepted, alternate representation; Conus baileyi Röckel & da Motta, 1979 (original combination)

= Conasprella baileyi =

Species of gastropod

Conasprella baileyi is a species of sea snail, a marine gastropod mollusk in the family Conidae, the cone snails and their allies.

Like all species within the genus Conasprella, these snails are predatory and venomous. They are capable of stinging humans, therefore live ones should be handled carefully or not at all.

== Description ==
=== Exterior Shell and Structure ===
The size of the shell varies between 20 mm and 32 mm. C. baileyi is white with tawny to orange colored spirally aligned blotches that follow the curvature of the body whorl. The larval whorl, or protoconch, typically has lighter colored splotches than on the body whorl. The aperture is narrow and written descriptions state that the aperture is white, though photos often show it as a sandy tan to orange color. The spire is moderate and concave conical coming to a pointed end at the protoconch. The spire consists of approximately 9-11 total whorls. The shell has a carinate, or sharp edged, shoulder.

=== Live Snail ===
See Conidae page for further information about live snails in the cone snail family. Little is known about C. baileyi as an individual living organism.

Like other species in Conidae, C. baileyi has an extendable proboscis and a radula used for hunting.

== Distribution and Habitat ==
This marine species occurs in the tropical Indo-West Pacific (the Philippines, Solomon Islands, New Caledonia, Loyalty Islands) and off Queensland, Australia. C. baileyi is a marine benthic species. Specimens are typically found between 100 and 400 meters below the surface in rocky rubble or hard coral.

== Life Habits ==
=== Diet ===
For hunting tactics of Conidae species, see Conidae.

C. baileyi is a carnivorous predator like other species in the family Conidae. This species is vermivorous and uses conotoxins to immobilize its prey before utilizing its proboscis to engulf the prey entirely for consumption.

=== Reproduction ===
C. baileyi reproduces sexually.

=== Locomotion ===
C. baileyi moves using mucus mediated gliding.
