= Neoterebra angelli =

Scientific classification
- Kingdom: Animalia
- Phylum: Mollusca
- Class: Gastropoda
- Subclass: Caenogastropoda
- Order: Neogastropoda
- Family: Terebridae
- Genus: Neoterebra
- Species: N. angelli

Binomial name
- Neoterebra angelli (J. Gibson-Smith & W. Gibson-Smith, 1984)

Synonyms
- Euterebra angelli (J. Gibson-Smith & W. Gibson-Smith, 1984); Strioterebrum angelli J. Gibson-Smith & W. Gibson-Smith, 1984; Strioterebrum quadrispiralis (Weisbord, 1962); Strioterebrum trispiralis (Weisbord, 1962); Terebra angelli (J. Gibson-Smith & W. Gibson-Smith, 1984)

Species of gastropod

Neoterebra angelli is a species of sea snail, a marine gastropod mollusk in the family Terebridae, the auger snails.
