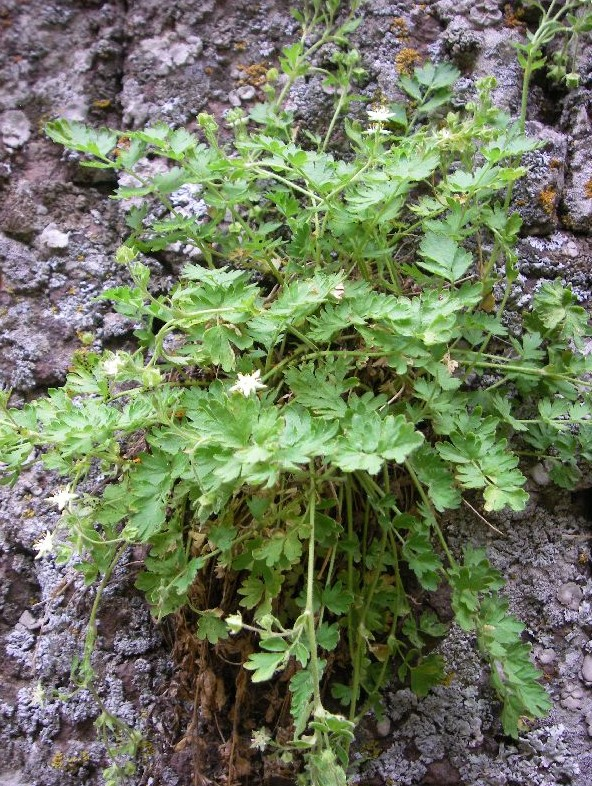

Conservation status
- Secure (NatureServe)

Scientific classification
- Kingdom: Plantae
- Clade: Embryophytes
- Clade: Tracheophytes
- Clade: Angiosperms
- Clade: Eudicots
- Clade: Rosids
- Order: Rosales
- Family: Rosaceae
- Genus: Potentilla
- Species: P. baileyi

Binomial name
- Potentilla baileyi (S.Watson) Greene

Varieties
- P. b. var. baileyi; P. b. var. beneolens

Synonyms
- Horkelia baileyi; Horkelia beneolens; Ivesia baileyi; Ivesia beneolens

= Potentilla baileyi =

Plant species in the rose family

Potentilla baileyi, commonly known as Bailey's ivesia, is a species of flowering plant in the rose family.

It is native to the Modoc Plateau of northeastern California and adjacent sections of Oregon, Nevada, and Idaho, as well as the northern slopes of the Sierra Nevada. It grows in volcanic rocky habitat, often growing from crevices in sheer rock faces.

== Description ==
Potentilla baileyi is a perennial herb forming clumps of green foliage, sometimes hanging from crevices where it has rooted. The leaves are up to 10 centimeters long and made up of several pairs of toothed leaflets.

The inflorescence is an open cyme of several tiny flowers with white, cream, or yellowish petals about 2 millimeters long.

== Taxonomy ==
The first scientific description of Potentilla baileyi was by Sereno Watson who placed it in the Ivesia genus as Ivesia baileyi in 1871. Sixteen years later in 1887 Edward Lee Greene moved it to Potentilla, giving the species its accepted name. However, some sources such as NatureServe continue to use the name Ivesia baileyi. Along with the rest of the genus it is part of the Rosaceae family and the species has two accepted varieties.

- Potentilla baileyi var. baileyi – Native to California and Nevada
- Potentilla baileyi var. beneolens – Native to California, Nevada, Idaho, and Oregon

Potentilla baileyi and variety beneolens each have three homotypic synonyms.

Table of Synonyms
Name	Year	Rank	Synonym of:	Notes
Horkelia baileyi (S.Watson) Rydb.	1898	species	P. baileyi	
Horkelia beneolens A.Nelson & J.F.Macbr.	1913	species	var. beneolens	
Ivesia baileyi S.Watson	1871	species	P. baileyi	
Ivesia baileyi var. beneolens (A.Nelson & J.F.Macbr.) Ertter	1989	variety	var. beneolens	
Ivesia baileyi subsp. typica D.D.Keck	1938	subspecies	P. baileyi	not validly publ.
Ivesia beneolens (A.Nelson & J.F.Macbr.) Rydb.	1917	species	var. beneolens	
