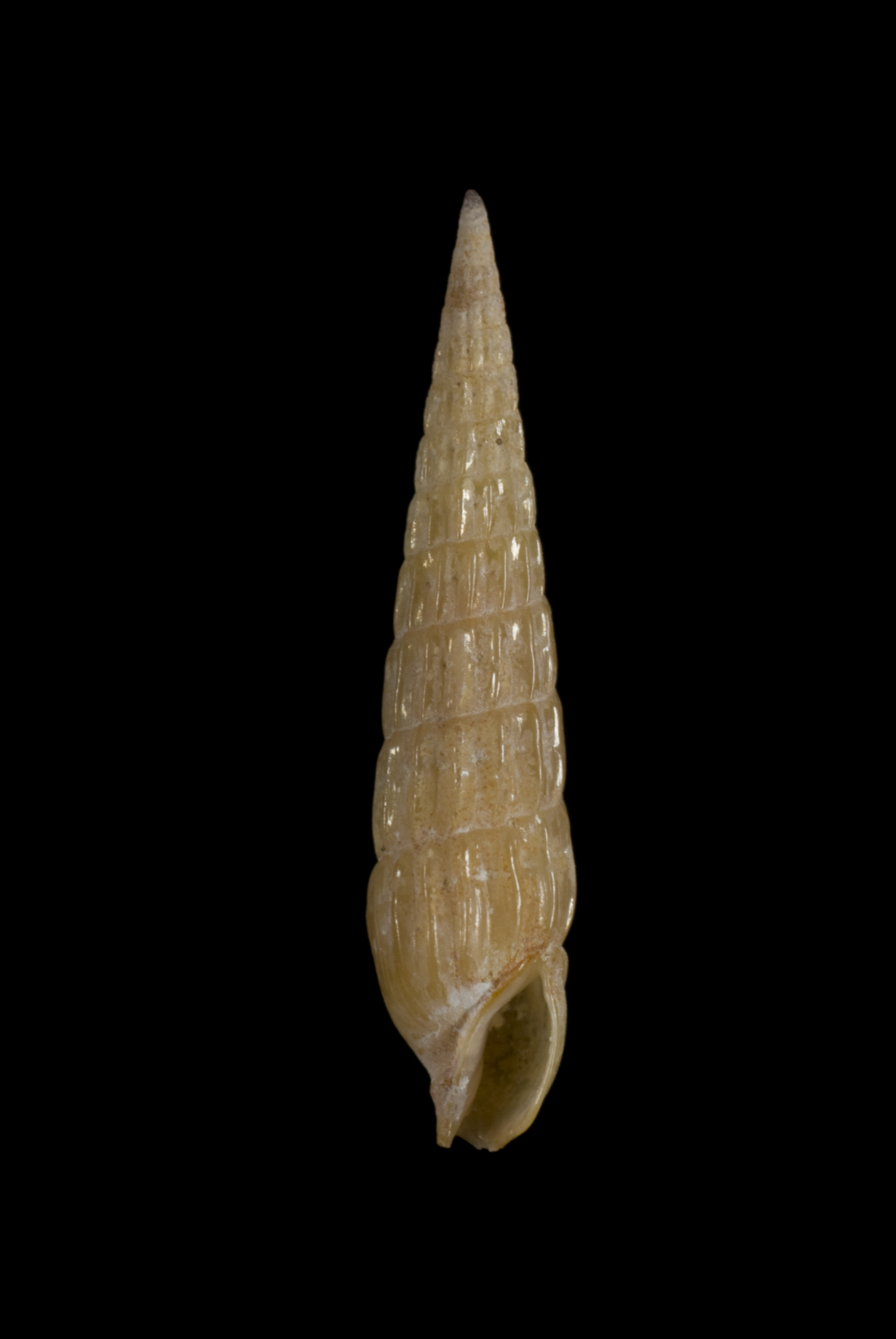

Scientific classification
- Kingdom: Animalia
- Phylum: Mollusca
- Class: Gastropoda
- Subclass: Caenogastropoda
- Order: Neogastropoda
- Superfamily: Conoidea
- Family: Terebridae
- Genus: Punctoterebra
- Species: P. nitida

Binomial name
- Punctoterebra nitida (Hinds, 1844)

Synonyms
- Hastula nitida (Hinds, 1844); Strioterebrum nitidum (Hinds, 1844); Terebra cernica G.B. Sowerby III, 1894; Terebra longiscata Deshayes, 1859 (original combination); Terebra nitida Hinds, 1844; Terebra nitida var. sicoydes Melvill & Sykes, 1898; Terebra plicatella Deshayes, 1857

= Punctoterebra nitida =

Species of gastropod

Punctoterebra nitida, common name the Shiny Pacific Auger, is a species of sea snail, a marine gastropod mollusk in the family Terebridae, the auger snails.

== Description ==
The size of an adult shell varies between 19 mm and 45 mm.

== Distribution ==
This species is distributed in the Indian Ocean along East Africa and the Aldabra Atoll; in the Western Pacific Ocean.
