= Dendropsophus baileyi =

Conservation status
- Least Concern (IUCN 3.1)

Scientific classification
- Kingdom: Animalia
- Phylum: Chordata
- Class: Amphibia
- Order: Anura
- Family: Hylidae
- Genus: Dendropsophus
- Species: D. baileyi

Binomial name
- Dendropsophus baileyi (Cochran, 1953)

Species of frog

Dendropsophus baileyi is a species of frog in the family Hylidae. It is endemic to Brazil. Its natural habitats are subtropical or tropical moist lowland forests, freshwater marshes, intermittent freshwater marshes, arable land, pastureland, plantations, rural gardens, urban areas, heavily degraded former forest, ponds, irrigated land, seasonally flooded agricultural land, and canals and ditches.
