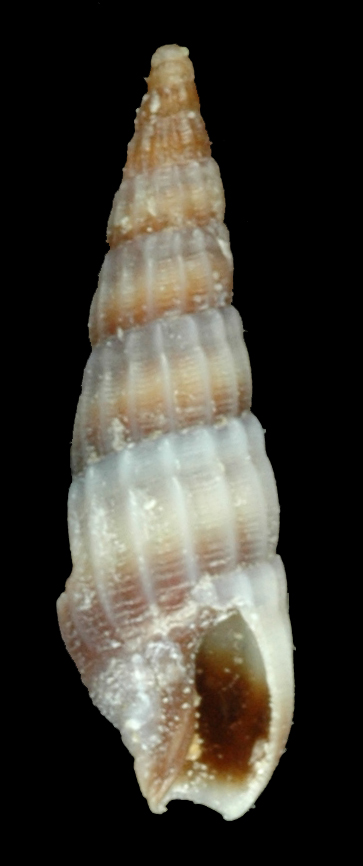

Scientific classification
- Kingdom: Animalia
- Phylum: Mollusca
- Class: Gastropoda
- Subclass: Caenogastropoda
- Order: Neogastropoda
- Family: Terebridae
- Genus: Partecosta
- Species: P. varia

Binomial name
- Partecosta varia (Bozzetti, 2008)

Synonyms
- Strioterebrum varia Bozzetti, 2008 (wrong grammatical agreement in original publication: mandatory change); Strioterebrum varium Bozzetti, 2008 (original combination)

= Partecosta varia =

Species of gastropod

Partecosta varia is a species of sea snail, a marine gastropod mollusk in the family Terebridae, the auger snails.

== Description ==
The length of an adult shell attains 8 mm.

== Distribution ==
This species is found in the Indian Ocean off South Madagascar.
