= Punctoterebra isabella =

Scientific classification
- Kingdom: Animalia
- Phylum: Mollusca
- Class: Gastropoda
- Subclass: Caenogastropoda
- Order: Neogastropoda
- Superfamily: Conoidea
- Family: Terebridae
- Genus: Punctoterebra
- Species: P. isabella

Binomial name
- Punctoterebra isabella (Thiele, 1925)

Synonyms
- Strioterebrum isabella (Thiele, 1925); Terebra isabella Thiele, 1925

Species of gastropod

Punctoterebra isabella is a species of sea snail, a marine gastropod mollusk in the family Terebridae, the auger snails.
