= Punctoterebra baileyi =

Scientific classification
- Kingdom: Animalia
- Phylum: Mollusca
- Class: Gastropoda
- Subclass: Caenogastropoda
- Order: Neogastropoda
- Superfamily: Conoidea
- Family: Terebridae
- Genus: Punctoterebra
- Species: P. baileyi

Binomial name
- Punctoterebra baileyi (Bratcher & Cernohorsky, 1982)

Synonyms
- Duplicaria baileyi Bratcher & Cernohorsky, 1982 (original combination)

Species of gastropod

Punctoterebra baileyi is a species of sea snail, a marine gastropod mollusk in the family Terebridae, the auger snails.
