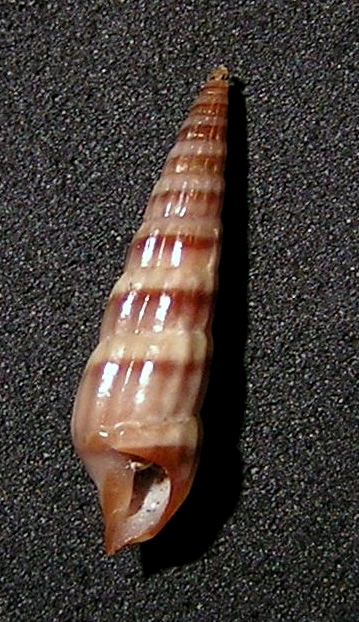
- Apertural view of a shell of Punctoterebra plumbea

Scientific classification
- Kingdom: Animalia
- Phylum: Mollusca
- Class: Gastropoda
- Subclass: Caenogastropoda
- Order: Neogastropoda
- Superfamily: Conoidea
- Family: Terebridae
- Genus: Punctoterebra
- Species: P. plumbea

Binomial name
- Punctoterebra plumbea (Quoy & Gaimard, 1833)

Synonyms
- Hastula plumbea (Quoy & Gaimard, 1964); Strioterebrum plumbeum (Quoy & Gaimard, 1833); Terebra assimilis Pease, 1871; Terebra bourguignati Deshayes, 1859; Terebra castaneofusca Thiele, 1925; Terebra clappi Pilsbry, 1921; Terebra contigua Pease, 1871; Terebra hoffmeyeri Abbott, 1952; Terebra plumbea Quoy & Gaimard, 1833

= Punctoterebra plumbea =

Species of gastropod

Punctoterebra plumbea, common name : the lead-coloured auger, is a species of sea snail, a marine gastropod mollusk in the family Terebridae, the auger snails.

== Description ==
The size of an adult shell varies between 13 mm and 25 mm.

== Distribution ==
This species occurs in the tropical Indo-West Pacific and off the Philippines, Hawaii, Papua New Guinea and the Solomons.
