= Punctoterebra caliginosa =

Scientific classification
- Kingdom: Animalia
- Phylum: Mollusca
- Class: Gastropoda
- Subclass: Caenogastropoda
- Order: Neogastropoda
- Superfamily: Conoidea
- Family: Terebridae
- Genus: Punctoterebra
- Species: P. caliginosa

Binomial name
- Punctoterebra caliginosa (Deshayes, 1859)

Synonyms
- Hastula caliginosa (Deshayes, 1859); Strioterebrum caliginosum (Deshayes, 1859); Terebra caliginosa Deshayes, 1859

Species of gastropod

Punctoterebra caliginosa is a species of sea snail, a marine gastropod mollusk in the family Terebridae, the auger snails.

== Description ==
The size of an adult shell varies between 15 mm and 42 mm.

== Distribution ==
This species is distributed in the Indian Ocean along South Africa and in the Pacific Ocean along the Philippines.
