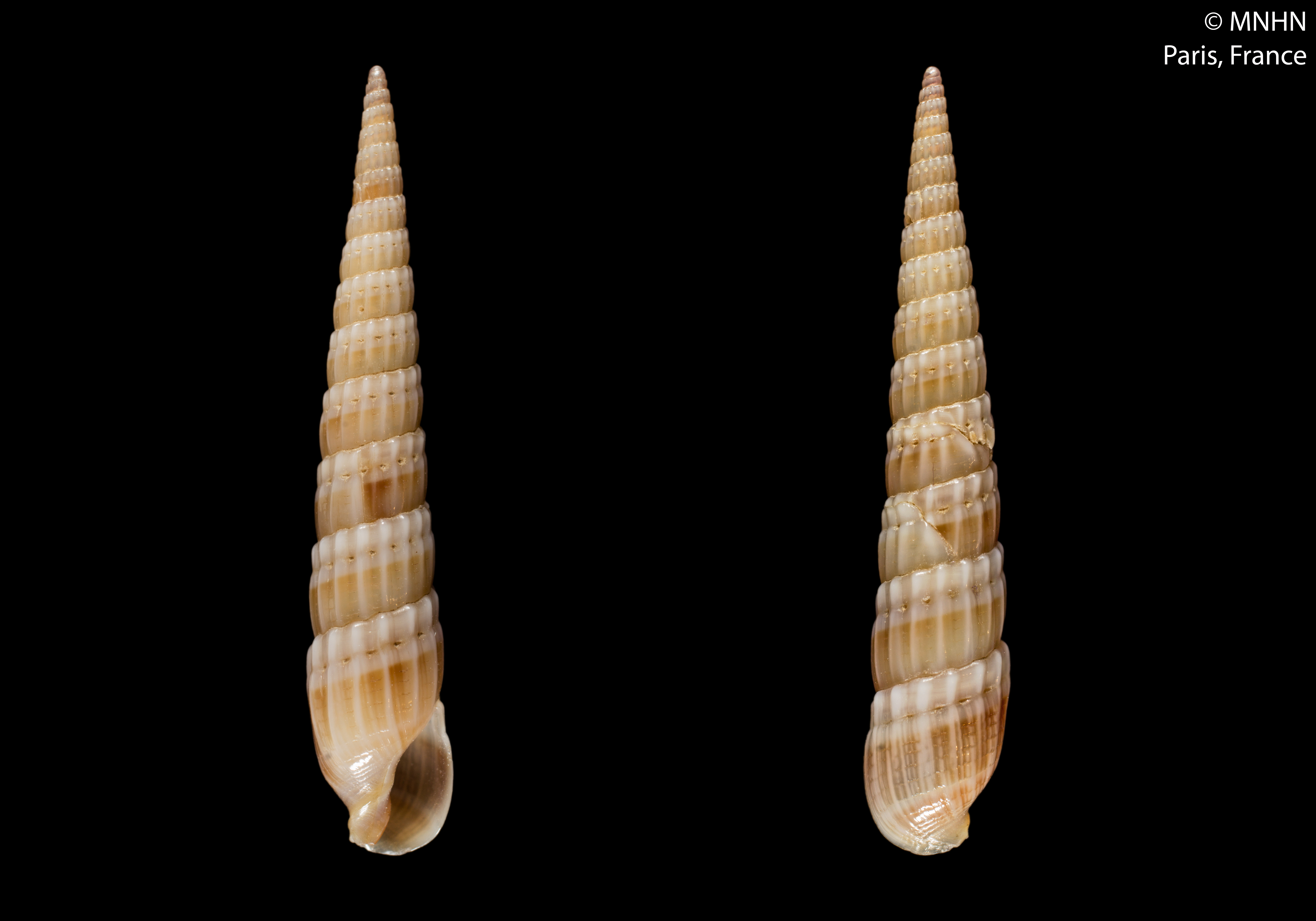
- Shell of Strioterebrum paucincisum (holotype at MNHN, Paris)

Scientific classification
- Kingdom: Animalia
- Phylum: Mollusca
- Class: Gastropoda
- Subclass: Caenogastropoda
- Order: Neogastropoda
- Superfamily: Conoidea
- Family: Terebridae
- Genus: Punctoterebra
- Species: P. paucincisa

Binomial name
- Punctoterebra paucincisa (Bratcher, 1988)

Synonyms
- Strioterebrum paucincisum (Bratcher, 1988); Terebra paucincisa Bratcher, 1988 (original combination)

= Punctoterebra paucincisa =

Species of gastropod

Punctoterebra paucincisa is a species of sea snail, a marine gastropod mollusk in the family Terebridae, the auger snails.

== Description ==
The size of an adult shell varies between 16 mm and 40 mm.

== Distribution ==
This species occurs in the Pacific Ocean off the Philippines, New Caledonia, and the Fiji Islands.
