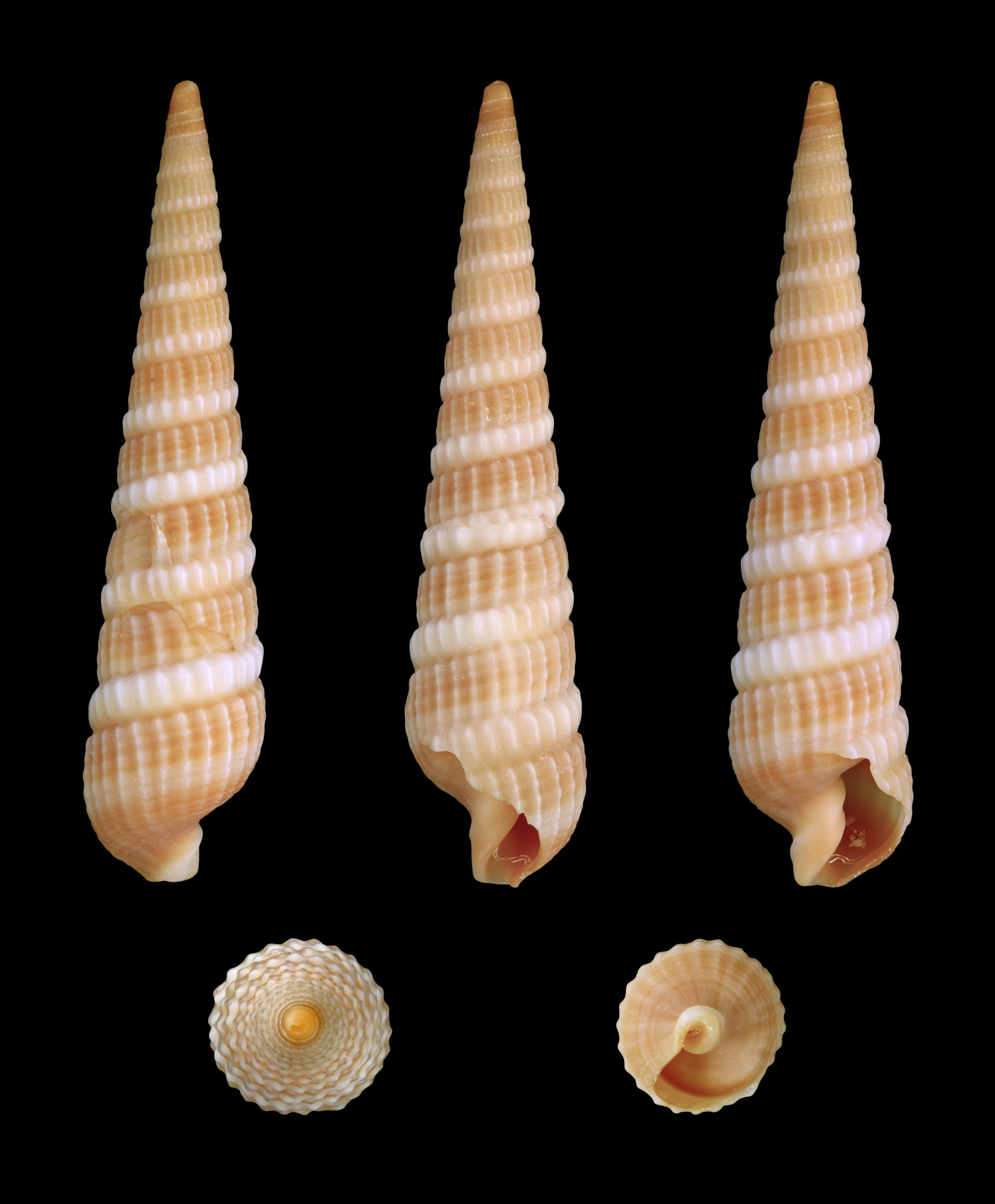

Scientific classification
- Kingdom: Animalia
- Phylum: Mollusca
- Class: Gastropoda
- Subclass: Caenogastropoda
- Order: Neogastropoda
- Family: Terebridae
- Genus: Neoterebra
- Species: N. dislocata

Binomial name
- Neoterebra dislocata (Say, 1822)

Synonyms
- Acus dislocatus (Say, 1822); Cerithium dislocatum Say, 1822; Strioterebrum onslowensis Petuch, 1974; Strioterebrum weisbordi J. Gibson-Smith & W. Gibson-Smith, 1984; Terebra dislocata (Say, 1822); Terebra petitii Kiener, 1839; Terebra rudis Gray, 1834

= Neoterebra dislocata =

Species of gastropod

Neoterebra dislocata, common name the eastern auger, is a species of sea snail, a marine gastropod mollusk in the family Terebridae, the auger snails.

== Description ==
The eastern auger Neoterebra dislocata measures on average up to 2 1/4 inches in length, with a pointed spire. The color varies but is often a pale grey or tan.

== Distribution ==
The species is found from Virginia to Brazil.

== Ecology ==
This species lives in sounds and offshore on shallow sand flats. The shell is commonly found washed up on sound and ocean beaches.

The Atlantic auger is a carnivore, but it lacks the radula and poison gland found in most other augers.
