= Oliva baileyi =

Scientific classification
- Kingdom: Animalia
- Phylum: Mollusca
- Class: Gastropoda
- Subclass: Caenogastropoda
- Order: Neogastropoda
- Family: Olividae
- Genus: Oliva
- Species: O. baileyi

Binomial name
- Oliva baileyi Petuch, 1979

Synonyms
- Oliva lenhilli Petuch & Sargent, 1986

Species of gastropod

Oliva baileyi is a species of sea snail, a marine gastropod mollusk in the family Olividae, the olives.

== Description ==
Original description: "Highly polished, thickened, oblong, cylindrical; spire short, flattened, calloused, with incised suture; callus of last whorl produced at posterior end of aperture; aperture narrow, straight; columella with 12-16 low teeth; posterior end of columella without teeth; color bright yellow-tan crossed diagonally by widely separated brown bands that extend from shoulder to anterior tip; diagonal brown bands never coalescing; spire callus bright purple, contrasting greatly with yellow shell; columella and teeth white; interior of aperture lavender."

== Distribution ==
Locus typicus: "Russell Island, Solomon Islands."
