= Punctoterebra arabella =

Scientific classification
- Kingdom: Animalia
- Phylum: Mollusca
- Class: Gastropoda
- Subclass: Caenogastropoda
- Order: Neogastropoda
- Superfamily: Conoidea
- Family: Terebridae
- Genus: Punctoterebra
- Species: P. arabella

Binomial name
- Punctoterebra arabella (Thiele, 1925)

Synonyms
- Strioterebrum arabellum (Thiele, 1925); Terebra arabella Thiele, 1925

Species of gastropod

Punctoterebra arabella is a species of sea snail, a marine gastropod mollusk in the family Terebridae, the auger snails.

== Description ==
The size of an adult shell varies between 11 mm and 22 mm.

== Distribution ==
This species occurs in the Pacific Ocean off Indonesia and French Polynesia.
