= Punctoterebra fuscotaeniata =

Scientific classification
- Kingdom: Animalia
- Phylum: Mollusca
- Class: Gastropoda
- Subclass: Caenogastropoda
- Order: Neogastropoda
- Superfamily: Conoidea
- Family: Terebridae
- Genus: Punctoterebra
- Species: P. fuscotaeniata

Binomial name
- Punctoterebra fuscotaeniata (Thiele, 1925)

Synonyms
- Strioterebrum fuscotaeniatum (Thiele, 1925); Terebra fuscotaeniata Thiele, 1925

Species of gastropod

Punctoterebra fuscotaeniata is a species of sea snail, a marine gastropod mollusk in the family Terebridae, the auger snails.

== Description ==
The size of an adult shell varies between 10 mm and 15 mm.

== Distribution ==
This marine species is found along Sumatra, Indonesia.
