= Emerald darter =

Conservation status
- Least Concern (IUCN 3.1)

Scientific classification
- Kingdom: Animalia
- Phylum: Chordata
- Class: Actinopterygii
- Order: Perciformes
- Family: Percidae
- Genus: Etheostoma
- Species: E. baileyi

Binomial name
- Etheostoma baileyi Page & Burr, 1982

Species of fish

The emerald darter (Etheostoma baileyi), is a species of freshwater ray-finned fish, a darter from the subfamily Etheostomatinae, part of the family Percidae, which also contains the perches, ruffes and pikeperches. It is found only in northern and eastern Kentucky and northeastern Tennessee.

== Description ==
The emerald darter males are generally slightly larger and are more dramatically colored than females, with green accents on various parts of their bodies. Emerald darters can be found in rocky pools of small to medium creeks and rivers that maintain temperatures ranging from 0 to 25 °C (32 to 77 °F).

== Distribution ==
The emerald darter is restricted to the Cumberland Plateau, including only the upper Cumberland River drainages in eastern Kentucky and northeastern Tennessee. Rivers where emerald darters can be found include the Red River, Jacks Creek, Indian Creek in Kentucky, and Clear Creek, Elk Creek, Poor Creek, and other small water systems. Though populations have fluctuated through the years, the emerald darter's geographic range has stayed the same, and in some areas they can even be found in abundance. Populations may have experienced declines in the past due to strip-mining and siltation in the gravel substrates in which it spawns.

== Ecology ==
Emerald darters compete heavily with other benthic freshwater fish in the southeastern United States. They are known as opportunistic feeders, relying on food and prey availability which fluctuates drastically throughout seasonal changes. Emerald darters are primarily insectivorous, and depending on size class, 80% to 100% of their diets can consist of small invertebrates. Emerald darters can be found in a variety of clear freshwater habitats with moderately low siltation. The fish can generally be found in water that ranges from 8 to 45 cm (3.1 to 17.7 in) in depth, though they are known to retreat to deeper, rock-lined pools during colder months and when floods alter current velocity. Emerald darters inhabit waters that range from 0 to 25 °C (32 to 77 °F), and can be found in riffles and runways up to 0.61 m/s (2.0 ft/s) flow velocity. As suggested by the emerald darter's subterminal mouth, they are benthic feeders, primarily consuming small invertebrates such as microcrustaceans, various types of larvae, and nematodes. Emerald darters tend to feed during the day, and their diets largely depend on the time of year, as prey availability changes due to season. They prefer streams with open sunlight and dense vegetation. No predators of emerald darters are known, and their cryptic coloration may help to conceal them in riffles with brightly colored rocks.

== Life history ==
Emerald darters spawn in late April and early May. Though actual spawning has not been observed, attempts by males to mate include swimming from side to side over the female's back. Further, males have been observed in the wild trying to mount unresponsive females from behind or from the side. Emerald darter larvae usually measure 4.5 to 6 mm (0.18 to 0.24 in) in length and emerge from the egg with yolk sacs still attached. Water temperature has a direct correlation with juvenile development, with warmer water temperatures resulting in a faster development and smaller sizes. Warmer temperatures can have even more detrimental effects on populations. Warmer temperatures in the later weeks of the breeding season can cause females to reabsorb their eggs and become unreceptive. Spawning occurs in the center of riffles. Larger males place themselves in pools near the middle of these turbulent areas so they will have a higher probability of encountering more females, which tend to use these areas. Emerald darters prefer gravel substrates that lack silt. Eggs and sperm are released simultaneously through mutual vibration and are attached by the female directly onto the gravel substrate. Emerald darters generally average 36 offspring per year. Most captured emerald darters have been aged at up to three years old. In the Red River drainage, 53% of the population survived its second year, while only 7.7% survived the third. Third-year individuals were predominantly male.

== Current management ==
The emerald darter is not currently listed as a state or federal threatened species, though they are experiencing population declines in Tennessee. Though emerald darters have experienced population fragmentation, their range has not undergone declines. Threats to populations include limited range, as well as strip-mining, which results in heavy siltation of the gravel substrates on which they depend for reproduction. Damming of Tennessee's main waterways has fragmented the emerald darter's habitat. Kentucky's populations are not considered threatened.

Management implications would include buffer areas around streams and wetlands to prevent deforestation. This would assist in the prevention of siltation in gravel substrates. More responsible coal practices or eliminating strip-mining altogether will have obvious effects on streams known to contain populations of emerald darters. Strategies such as these are imperative to the conservation of E. baileyi because even localized destruction of its habitat could have devastating effects on its populations. Unfortunately, emerald darters' benthic feeding habits make this species significantly more susceptible to alterations in habitat.

== Taxonomy and etymology ==
The emerald darter was first formally described in 1982 by Lawrence M. Page and Brooks Burr with the type locality being given as the Little Sexton Creek which is a tributary of the South Fork Kentucky River in Clay County, Kentucky. The specific name honours the American ichthyologist Reeve Maclaren Bailey (1911–2011) who was Curator Emeritus of Fishes and Professor Emeritus of Zoology, University of Michigan, Museum of Zoology, Ann Arbor, Michigan, in recognition of his contribution to systematic ichthyology. The emerald darter has been classified in the subgenus Ulocentra, the snubnose darters and shares many similarities with other species in the group, such as eight or nine dorsal saddles, a blunt nose, scales on the belly, and other distinguishing characteristics. Emerald darters are moderate-sized darters, ranging from 2.9 to 5 cm (1.1 to 2.0 in). However, molecular phylogenies have not recovered much evidence of paraphyly within the genus Etheostoma and thus the evidence supporting the use of subgenera for taxonomy in this genus is not strong.
