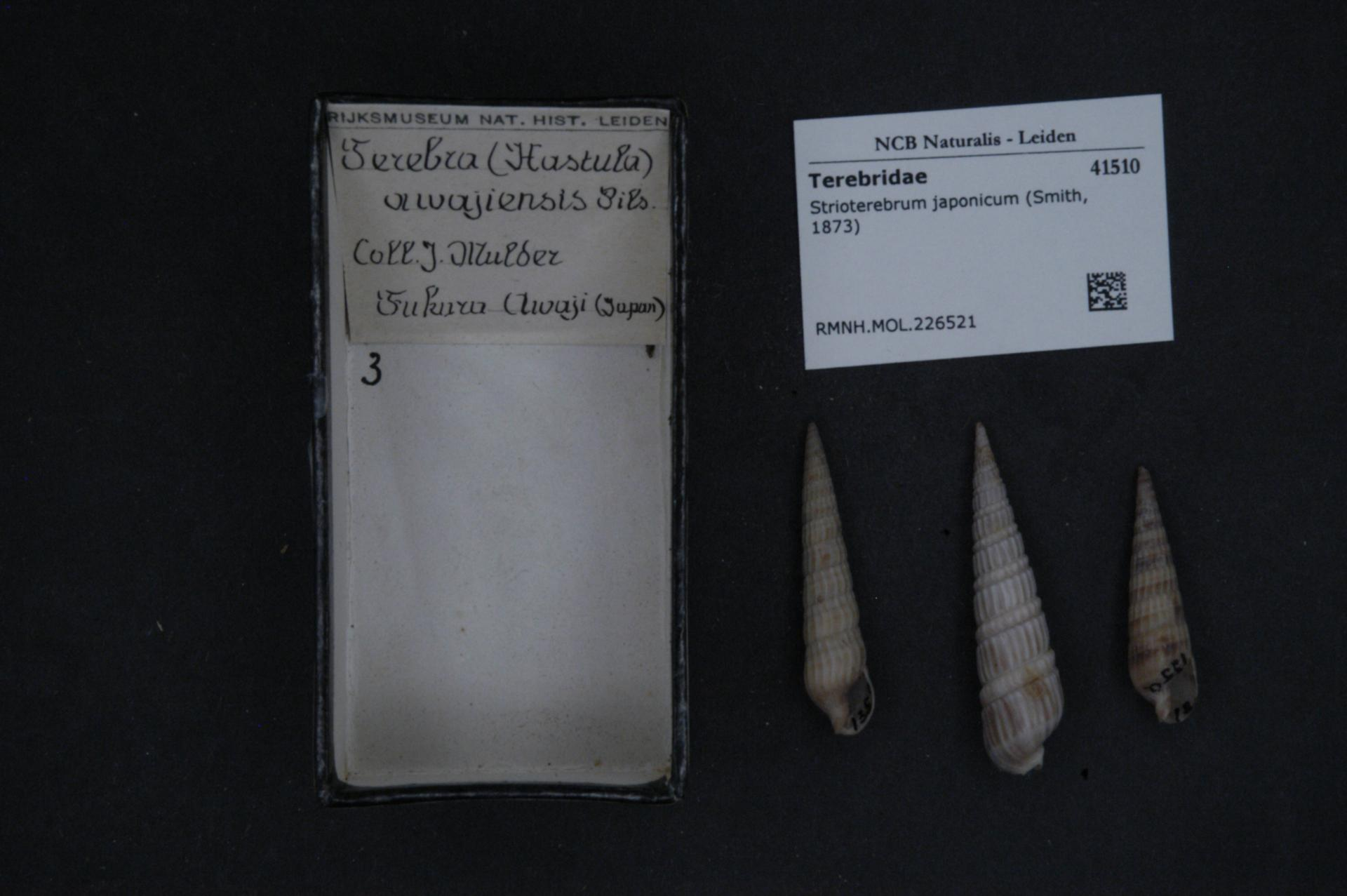
- Punctoterebra japonica, 1873

Scientific classification
- Kingdom: Animalia
- Phylum: Mollusca
- Class: Gastropoda
- Subclass: Caenogastropoda
- Order: Neogastropoda
- Superfamily: Conoidea
- Family: Terebridae
- Genus: Punctoterebra
- Species: P. japonica

Binomial name
- Punctoterebra japonica (E.A. Smith, 1873)

Synonyms
- Brevimyurella japonica (E.A. Smith); Strioterebrum japonicum (E. A. Smith, 1873); Terebra japonica E.A. Smith, 1873

= Punctoterebra japonica =

Species of gastropod

Punctoterebra japonica is a species of sea snail, a marine gastropod mollusk in the family Terebridae, the auger snails.

== Description ==
The size of an adult shell varies between 20 mm and 47 mm.

== Distribution ==
This marine species is found off Japan.
