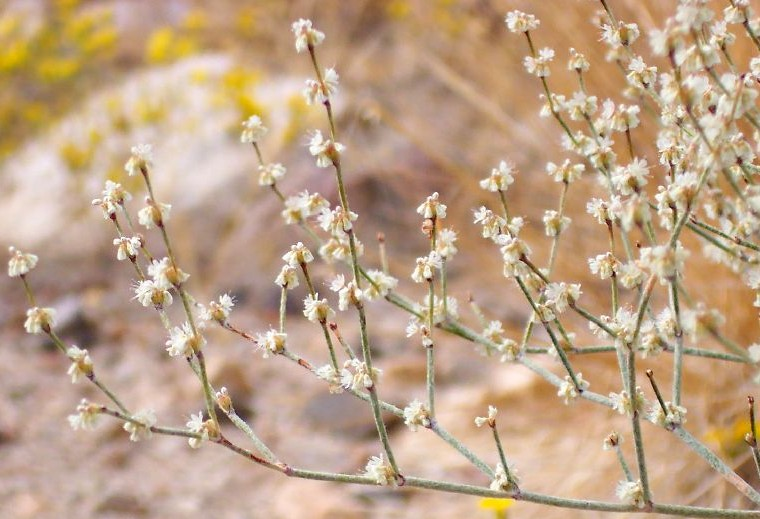

Conservation status
- Secure (NatureServe)

Scientific classification
- Kingdom: Plantae
- Clade: Embryophytes
- Clade: Tracheophytes
- Clade: Angiosperms
- Clade: Eudicots
- Order: Caryophyllales
- Family: Polygonaceae
- Genus: Eriogonum
- Species: E. baileyi

Binomial name
- Eriogonum baileyi S.Watson

Synonyms
- Eriogonum commixtum; Eriogonum praebens; Eriogonum restioides

= Eriogonum baileyi =

Species of wild buckwheat

Eriogonum baileyi is a species of wild buckwheat that is commonly known as Bailey's buckwheat. It is native to the western United States, where it is a common member of the flora in several types of sandy habitat, such as desert and sagebrush. Eriogonum baileyi is an annual herb. It produces a spreading to erect, often wool-coated stem up to about half a meter tall. Leaves are woolly, round and located at the base of the plant. The inflorescence is a branching cyme bearing many clusters of flowers. The individual flowers are 1 to 2 millimeters wide and white or pink in color.

== Taxonomy ==
The botanist Sereno Watson scientifically described and named Eriogonum baileyi in 1875. It was reclassified as a subspecies of Eriogonum vimineum in 1936 by Susan Gabriella Stokes and as a variety in 1952 by Ray Joseph Davis, but these have not become accepted by other botanists. It is classified in the Eriogonum genus as part of the Polygonaceae family. The species has two accepted varieties.

- Eriogonum baileyi var. baileyi – Native to California, Nevada, Utah, Oregon, Washington, and Idaho
- Eriogonum baileyi var. praebens – Native to northeast California, Nevada, and Idaho

Eriogonum baileyi has 11 synonyms of the species or one of its two varieties.

Table of Synonyms
Name	Year	Rank	Synonym of:	Notes
Eriogonum baileyi var. divaricatum (Gand.) Reveal	1968	variety	var. praebens	= het.
Eriogonum baileyi var. porphyreticum S.Stokes ex M.E.Jones	1903	variety	var. baileyi	= het.
Eriogonum commixtum Greene ex Tidestr.	1923	species	var. praebens	= het.
Eriogonum praebens Gand.	1906	species	var. praebens	≡ hom.
Eriogonum praebens var. divaricatum Gand.	1906	variety	var. praebens	= het.
Eriogonum restioides Gand.	1906	species	var. baileyi	= het.
Eriogonum vimineum subsp. baileyi (S.Watson) S.Stokes	1936	subspecies	E. baileyi	≡ hom.
Eriogonum vimineum var. baileyi (S.Watson) R.J.Davis	1952	variety	E. baileyi	≡ hom.
Eriogonum vimineum var. multiradiatum S.Stokes	1936	variety	var. baileyi	= het.
Eriogonum vimineum var. porphyreticum (S.Stokes ex M.E.Jones) S.Stokes	1936	variety	var. baileyi	= het.
Eriogonum vimineum var. restioides (Gand.) S.Stokes	1936	variety	var. baileyi	= het.
Notes: ≡ homotypic synonym; = heterotypic synonym
