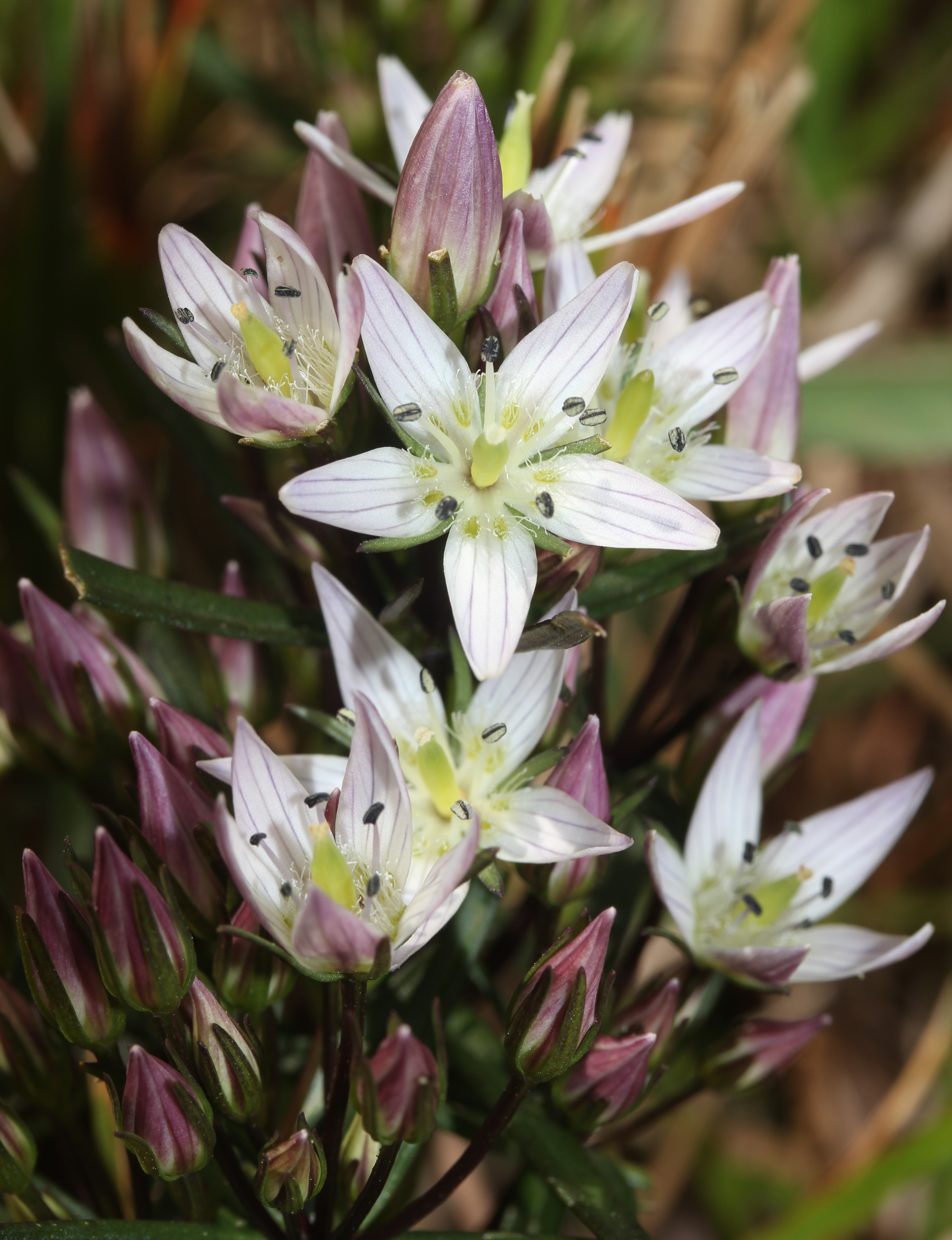
- Swertia japonica in Mount Ibuki

Scientific classification
- Kingdom: Plantae
- Clade: Tracheophytes
- Clade: Angiosperms
- Clade: Eudicots
- Clade: Asterids
- Order: Gentianales
- Family: Gentianaceae
- Genus: Swertia
- Species: S. japonica

Binomial name
- Swertia japonica (Schult) Makino

Synonyms
- Synonymy: Ophelia japonica Griseb.

= Swertia japonica =

Species of plant

Swertia japonica, also known as senburi (センブリ), is a biennial plant species in the family Gentianaceae. It is one of the most widely-used medicinal herbs in Japan.

== Description ==
Swertia japonica is a biennial plant native mainly to Japan, but also found in Korea and China. Its leaves are linear and it has small flowers with a corolla diameter of 2 to 3 centimeters. The flowers have five petals and are white with purple veins. The plant can grow from 5 to 50 centimeters in height.

It is said that the plant was named senburi (センブリ) because it tastes bitter even after being boiling a thousand times: the Japanese word sen (せん) meaning 'thousand'. It grows wild in meadows and high ground across Japan and is harvested as a medicinal herb. Swertia japonica was first domesticated in the 1970s in Nagano Prefecture. In 2007, 76% of cultivated Swertia japonica in Japan was produced there, with the rest grown in Kochi Prefecture.

The plant is a biennial flowering plant with a two-year biological life cycle. During their first year, seedlings produce several internodes, which elongate after the spring of the second year. The plant can be harvested by the following October, when its flowers open. The plant's seed is tiny and does not germinate readily, so it can easily be defeated by weeds. The principal constituents extracted from Swertia japonica are saponins such as swertiamarin, sweroside, amarogentin, amaroswerin, and gentiopicroside. The plant also contains secoiridoids, phenyl glucosides, flavonoids, and xanthones.

The traditional medicinal form of Swertia japonica is known as tōyaku (当薬) in Japan. According to Comprehensive Natural Products II: Chemistry and Biology, it is considered to be one of the most popular medicinal herbs and one of the bitterest herbs in Japan. It was first noted as a medicinal herb in 1892, in the second edition of the Japanese Pharmacopeia, as a substitute for gentian, but was only officially listed in the fourth edition of the Japanese Pharmacopoeia in 1920. It is used as a digestive stimulant and to treat gastrointestinal diseases such as diarrhea and nausea. It has also been found to be an effective anticholinergic. According to Wakan Sansai Zue, a decoction of the herb was used as a laundry additive during the Edo Period to act as an insecticide for fleas and lice. It was also mixed with glue to treat byōbu against insect damage.

== See also ==
- List of kampo herbs
