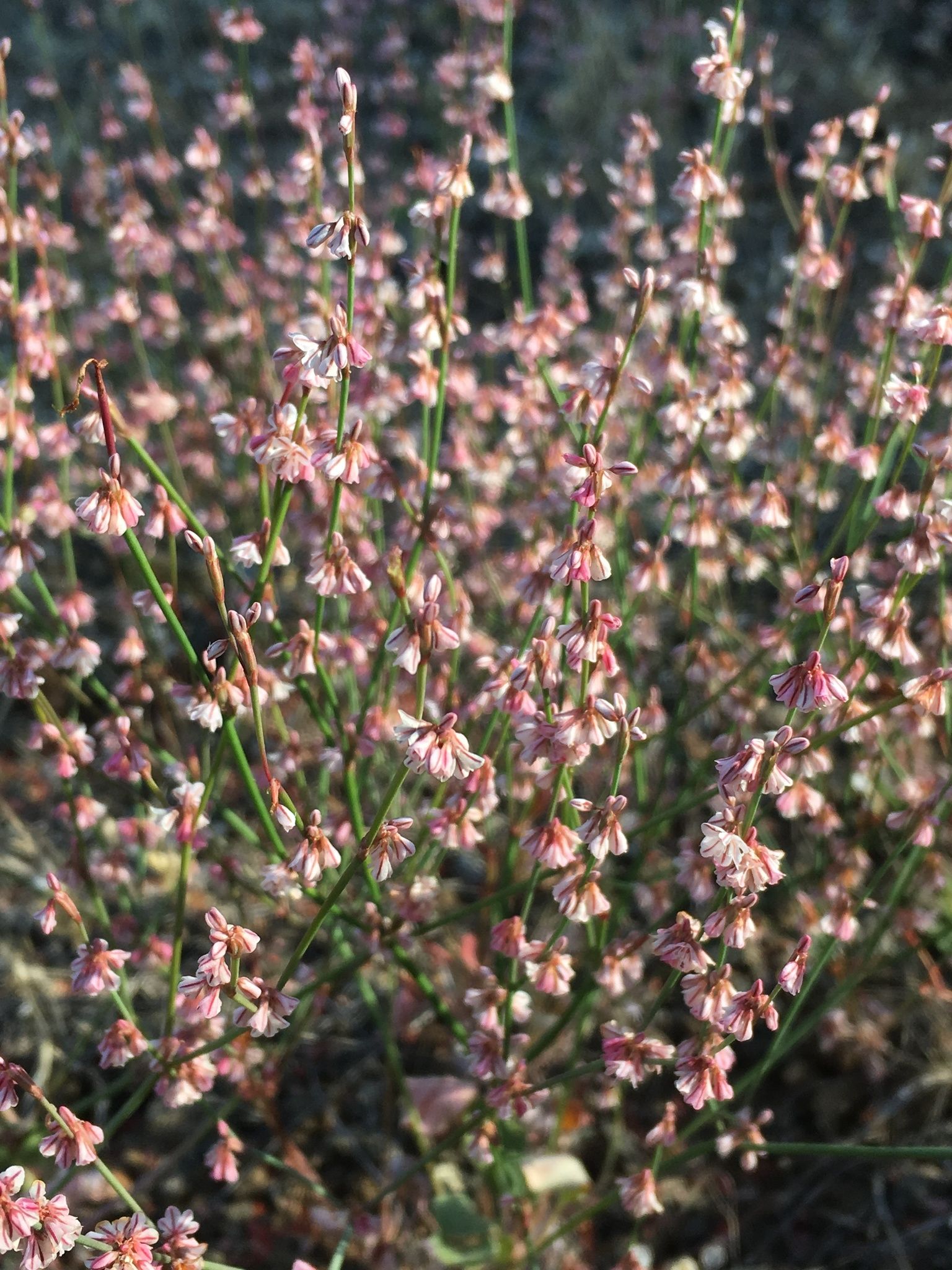

Scientific classification
- Kingdom: Plantae
- Clade: Tracheophytes
- Clade: Angiosperms
- Clade: Eudicots
- Order: Caryophyllales
- Family: Polygonaceae
- Genus: Eriogonum
- Species: E. vimineum

Binomial name
- Eriogonum vimineum Dougl. ex Benth.

= Eriogonum vimineum =

Species of wild buckwheat

Eriogonum vimineum is a species of wild buckwheat known by the common name wickerstem buckwheat. It is native to the Northwestern United States, California, and Nevada where it is common to abundant in many types of habitat, including the Sierra Nevada.

== Description ==
Eriogonum vimineum is a slender annual herb producing flowering stems up to about 30 centimeters tall surrounded at the bases by rosettes of rounded to oval leaves. The inflorescence is a wide open array of branches lined with clusters of pink to yellowish or white flowers striped with darker midribs.
