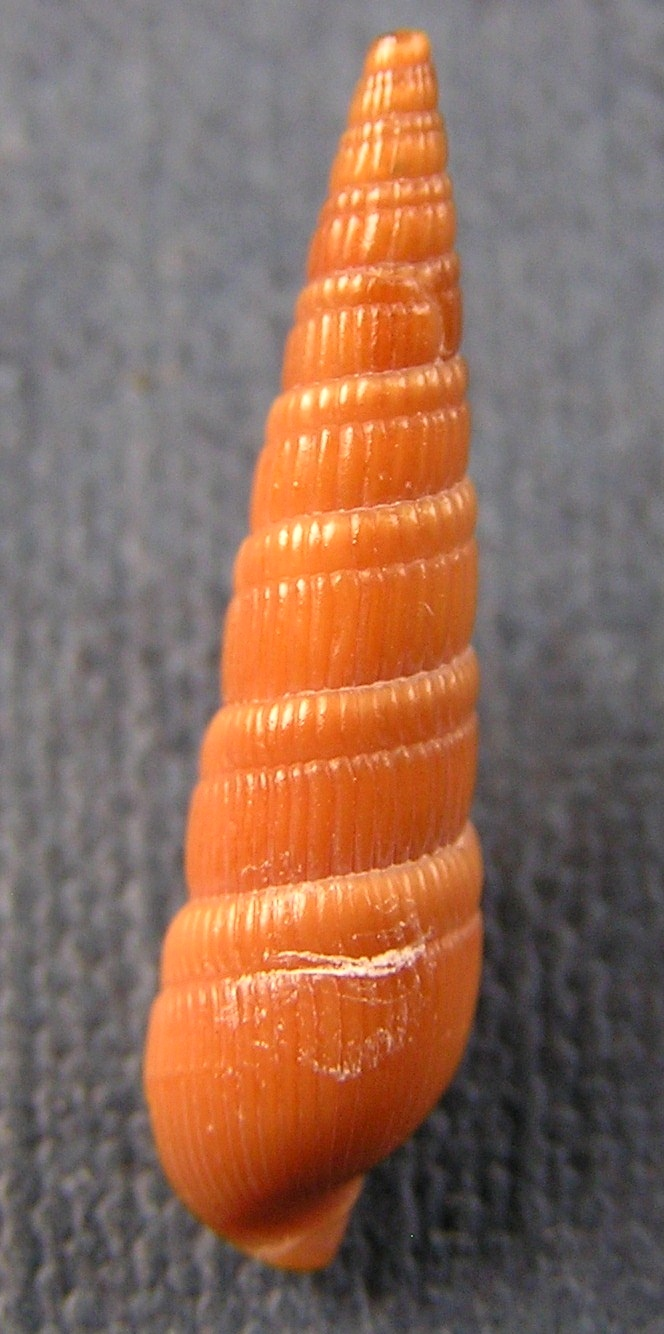
- Shell of Duplicaria kieneri

Scientific classification
- Kingdom: Animalia
- Phylum: Mollusca
- Class: Gastropoda
- Subclass: Caenogastropoda
- Order: Neogastropoda
- Family: Terebridae
- Genus: Duplicaria; Dall, 1909

Type species
- Buccinum duplicatum Linnaeus, 1758

Species
- See text

Synonyms
- Diplomeriza Dall, 1919 (Unnecessary replacement name for Duplicaria); Duplicaria (Duplicaria) Dall, 1908 ·; Euterebra Cotton & Godfrey, 1932; Myurellisca Bartsch, 1923; Pervicacia Iredale, 1924

= Duplicaria (gastropod) =

Genus of gastropods

Duplicaria is a genus of sea snails, marine gastropod mollusks in the family Terebridae, the auger snails.

== Species ==
Species within the genus Duplicaria include:

- † Duplicaria aequalis Harzhauser, Raven & Landau, 2018
- Duplicaria albozonata (Smith, 1875)
- † Duplicaria angulifera (Marwick, 1931)
- Duplicaria arenosa Terryn, 2021
- Duplicaria australis (Smith, 1873)
- Duplicaria badia (Deshayes, 1859)
- Duplicaria barrywilsoni Terryn, Marrow & H. Morrison, 2021
- † Duplicaria benesulcata (Bartrum, 1919)
- Duplicaria bernardii (Deshayes, 1857)
- Duplicaria bharatensis Terryn, 2023
- Duplicaria brevicula (Deshayes, 1859)
- Duplicaria casuarina Terryn, Marrow & H. Morrison, 2021
- Duplicaria concolor (Smith, 1873)
- Duplicaria copula (Hinds, 1844)
- Duplicaria costellifera (Pease, 1869)
- Duplicaria crakei Burch, 1965
- † Duplicaria crassa (Tate, 1886)
- Duplicaria darwini Terryn, Marrow & H. Morrison, 2021
- Duplicaria duplicata (Linnaeus, 1758)
- Duplicaria dussumierii (Kiener, 1839)
- Duplicaria evoluta (Deshayes, 1859)
- Duplicaria exmouthensis Terryn, Marrow & H. Morrison, 2021
- Duplicaria faustinatoi Terryn, 2021
- Duplicaria fictilis (Hinds, 1844)
- Duplicaria franknolfi Terryn, 2021
- Duplicaria gemmulata (Kiener, 1839)
- Duplicaria gianluigii Terryn, 2021
- Duplicaria helenae (Hinds, 1844)
- Duplicaria herberti Malcolm, Terryn & Fedosov, 2020
- Duplicaria hilutunganensis Terryn, 2021
- Duplicaria hormuzensis Terryn, 2023
- Duplicaria hubrechti Terryn & Chino, 2022
- Duplicaria ivanmarrowi Terryn, Marrow & H. Morrison, 2021
- Duplicaria jukesi (Deshayes, 1857)
- Duplicaria juliae (Aubry, 1999)
- Duplicaria kellydhondtae Terryn, 2021
- Duplicaria kieneri (Deshayes, 1859)
- Duplicaria kirai (Oyama, 1962-a)
- Duplicaria kirstenae Terryn & Fraussen, 2019
- Duplicaria koreana (Yoo, 1976): synonym of Duplicaria badia (Deshayes, 1859)
- Duplicaria lamarckii (Kiener, 1837)
- Duplicaria lovelli Terryn, Marrow & H. Morrison, 2021
- Duplicaria magnifica Terryn, 2023
- Duplicaria meadhunteri Terryn, 2023
- Duplicaria monsecourorum Terryn, 2021
- Duplicaria latisulcata (Yokoyama, 1922)
- Duplicaria lovelli Terryn, Marrow & H. Morrison, 2021
- Duplicaria magnifica Terryn, 2023
- Duplicaria meadhunteri Terryn, 2023
- Duplicaria monsecourorum Terryn, 2021
- Duplicaria morbida (Reeve, 1860)
- Duplicaria mozambiquensis Bratcher & Cernohorsky, 1982
- Duplicaria nadinae (Aubry, 2008)
- † Duplicaria omahuensis (Marwick, 1926)
- Duplicaria oponensis Terryn, 2021
- Duplicaria patmartii Terryn, 2023
- Duplicaria peroni Terryn, Marrow & H. Morrison, 2021
- Duplicaria recticostata (Yokoyama, 1920)
- Duplicaria reevei (Deshayes, 1857)
- Duplicaria remanalva (Melvill, 1910)
- Duplicaria richeri Terryn, 2021
- Duplicaria sharqiya Terryn, Rosado & Gori, 2020
- Duplicaria silvanae (Aubry, 1999)
- Duplicaria similis Smith, 1873
- Duplicaria slacksmithae Terryn, Marrow & H. Morrison, 2021
- Duplicaria sowerbyana (Deshayes, 1857)
- Duplicaria spectabilis (Hinds, 1844)
- Duplicaria stevemarshalli Terryn, Marrow & H. Morrison, 2021
- Duplicaria timcordelli Terryn, Marrow & H. Morrison, 2021
- † Duplicaria timida (Marwick, 1931)
- Duplicaria tricincta (E. A. Smith, 1877)
- Duplicaria tristis (Deshayes, 1859)
- Duplicaria tsuchidai Terryn, 2023
- Duplicaria ustulata (Deshayes, 1857)
- Duplicaria vandammei Terryn, Marrow & H. Morrison, 2021
- Duplicaria verhaeghei Terryn, 2021
- Duplicaria veronicae (Nicolay & Angioy, 1993)
- Duplicaria zanzibarica Terryn, 2021

== Synonyms ==
- Duplicaria albofuscata (Bozzetti, 2008): synonym of Partecosta albofuscata (Bozzetti, 2008)
- Duplicaria angolensis (Aubry, 1999): synonym of Oxymeris senegalensis (Lamarck, 1822)
- Duplicaria anseeuwi (Terryn, 2005): synonym of Profunditerebra anseeuwi (Terryn, 2005)
- Duplicaria ballina Hedley, 1915: synonym of Strioterebrum ballinum (Hedley, 1915)
- Duplicaria baileyi Bratcher & Cernohorsky, 1982: synonym of Punctoterebra baileyi (Bratcher & Cernohorsky, 1982) (original combination)
- Duplicaria benthalis (Dall, 1889): synonym of Bathyterebra benthalis (Dall, 1889)
- Duplicaria bernardii (Deshayes, 1857): synonym of Duplicaria bernardi (Deshayes, 1857)
- Duplicaria capensis (E.A. Smith, 1873): synonym of Gradaterebra capensis (E.A. Smith, 1873)
- Duplicaria coriolisi (Aubry, 1999): synonym of Bathyterebra coriolisi (Aubry, 1999)
- Duplicaria deynzerorum Sprague, 2004: synonym of Hastula raphanula (Lamarck, 1822)
- Duplicaria dussumieri [sic]: synonym of Duplicaria dussumierii (Kiener, 1839)
- Duplicaria easmithi (Aubry, 1999): synonym of Gradaterebra easmithi (Aubry, 1999)
- Duplicaria flexicostata (Suter, 1909), Duplicaria propelevis (Ponder, 1968) and Duplicaria tristis (Deshayes, 1859) are synonyms for Euterebra tristis (Deshayes, 1859)
- Duplicaria gouldi (Deshayes, 1857): synonym of Oxymeris gouldi (Deshayes, 1857)
- Duplicaria hiradoensis (Pilsbry, 1921): synonym of Duplicaria evoluta (Deshayes, 1859)
- Duplicaria luandensis (Aubry, 2008): synonym of Terebra luandensis Aubry, 2008
- Duplicaria nadinae (Aubry, 2008): synonym of Terebra nadinae Aubry, 2008
- Duplicaria pilsbryi (Aubry, 1999): synonym of Gradaterebra pilsbryi (Aubry, 1999)
- Duplicaria propelevis (Ponder, 1868): synonym of Euterebra tristis (Deshayes, 1859)
- Duplicaria raphanula (Lamarck, 1822 in 1815-22): synonym of Hastula raphanula (Lamarck, 1822)
- Duplicaria sinae Prelle, 2011: synonym of Oxymeris senegalensis (Lamarck, 1822)
- Duplicaria teramachii Burch, 1965: synonym of Punctoterebra teramachii (R. D. Burch, 1965) (original combination)
- Duplicaria thaanumi (Pilsbry, 1921): synonym of Oxymeris costellifera (Pease, 1869)
- Duplicaria tiurensis (Schepman, 1913): synonym of Terebra tiurensis Schepman, 1913
- Duplicaria trochlea (Deshayes, 1857): synonym of Oxymeris trochlea (Deshayes, 1857)
- Duplicaria vallesia Hedley, 1912: synonym of Duplicaria bernardii (Deshayes, 1857)
