= Mangelia payraudeauti =

Scientific classification
- Kingdom: Animalia
- Phylum: Mollusca
- Class: Gastropoda
- Subclass: Caenogastropoda
- Order: Neogastropoda
- Superfamily: Conoidea
- Family: Mangeliidae
- Genus: Mangelia
- Species: M. payraudeauti

Binomial name
- Mangelia payraudeauti (Deshayes, 1835)

Synonyms
- Pleurotoma payraudeauti Deshayes, 1835; Pleurotoma valenciennesi Maravigna, 1840

Species of gastropod

Mangelia payraudeauti is a species of sea snail, a marine gastropod mollusk in the family Mangeliidae.

Not to be confused with Pleurotoma payraudeauti Weinkauff, H.C., 1868

This species is considered by Tucker as a synonym of Mangelia attenuata (Montagu, G., 1803)

== Distribution ==
This species occurs in European waters off Portugal and Spain.
