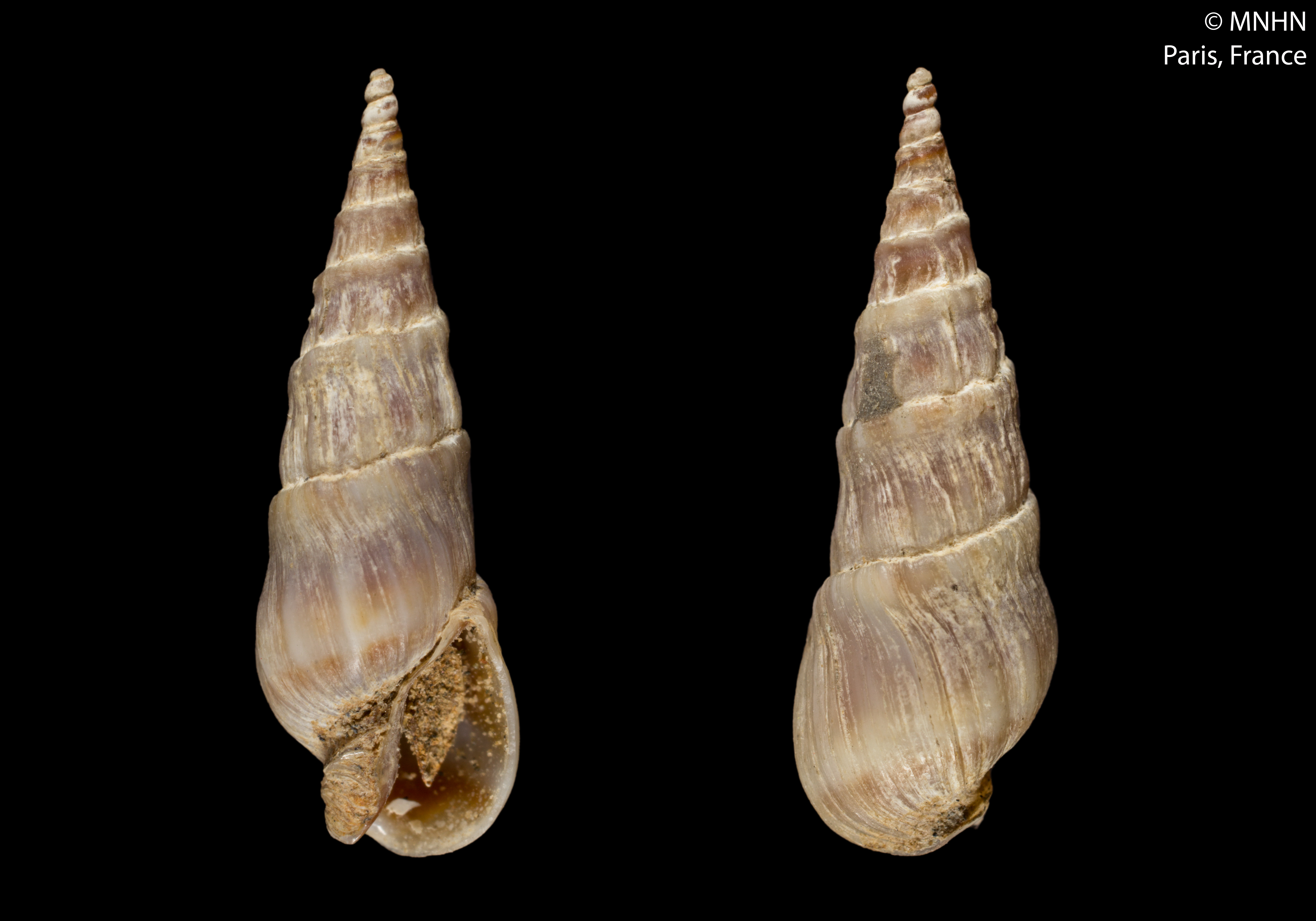
- Shell of Duplicaria brevicula (holotype at MNHN, Paris)

Scientific classification
- Kingdom: Animalia
- Phylum: Mollusca
- Class: Gastropoda
- Subclass: Caenogastropoda
- Order: Neogastropoda
- Family: Terebridae
- Genus: Duplicaria
- Species: D. brevicula

Binomial name
- Duplicaria brevicula (Deshayes, 1859)

Synonyms
- Euterebra brevicula (Deshayes, 1859); Terebra brevicula Deshayes, 1859; Terebra gruveli Dautzenberg, 1912

= Duplicaria brevicula =

Species of gastropod

Duplicaria brevicula is a species of sea snail, a marine gastropod mollusk in the family Terebridae, the auger snails.

== Distribution ==
This marine species occurs in the Atlantic Ocean off Namibia.
