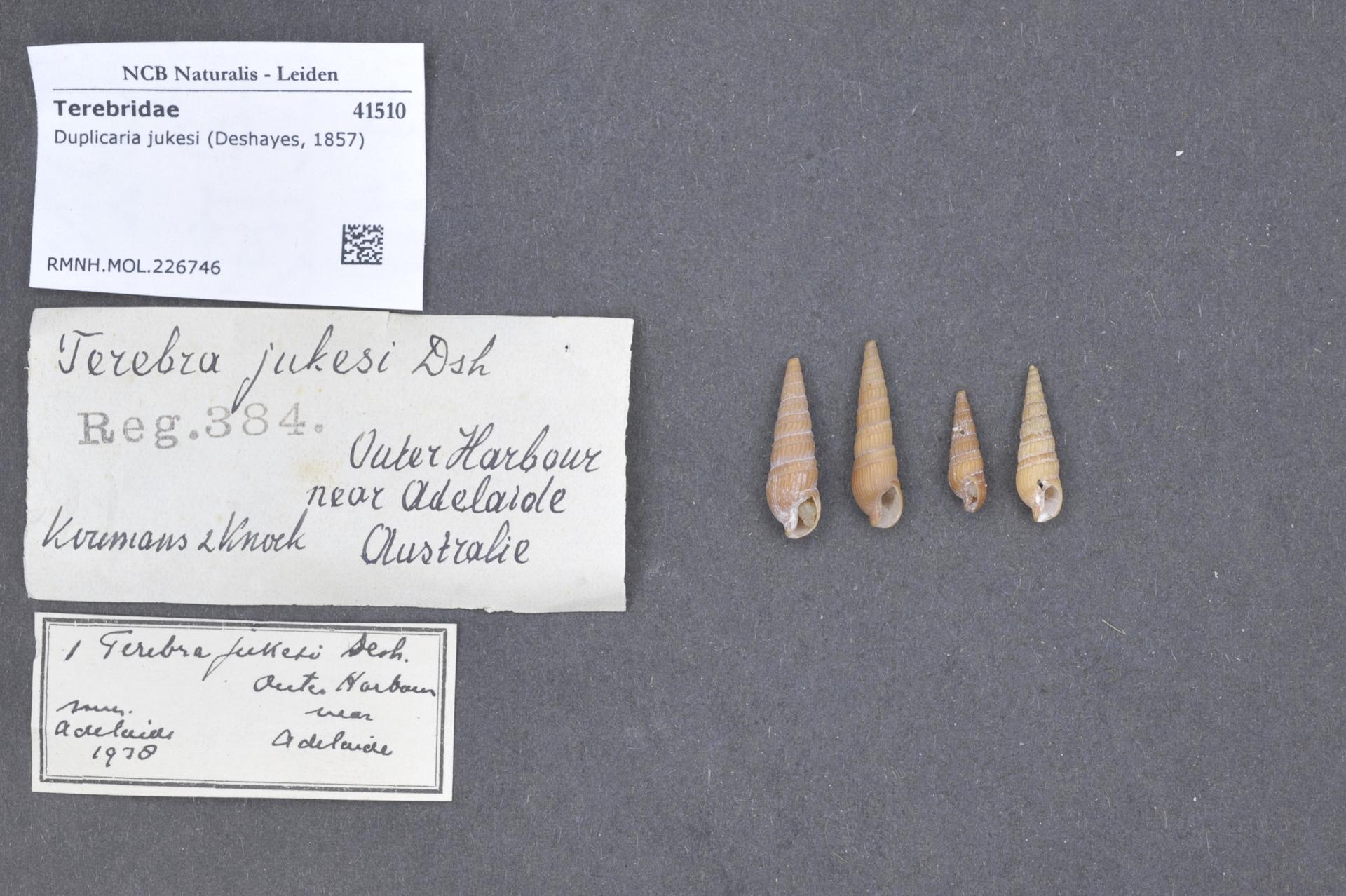

Scientific classification
- Kingdom: Animalia
- Phylum: Mollusca
- Class: Gastropoda
- Subclass: Caenogastropoda
- Order: Neogastropoda
- Family: Terebridae
- Genus: Duplicaria
- Species: D. jukesi

Binomial name
- Duplicaria jukesi (Deshayes, 1857)

Synonyms
- Terebra jukesi Deshayes, 1857

= Duplicaria jukesi =

Species of gastropod

Duplicaria jukesi is a species of sea snail, a marine gastropod mollusk in the family Terebridae, the auger snails.
