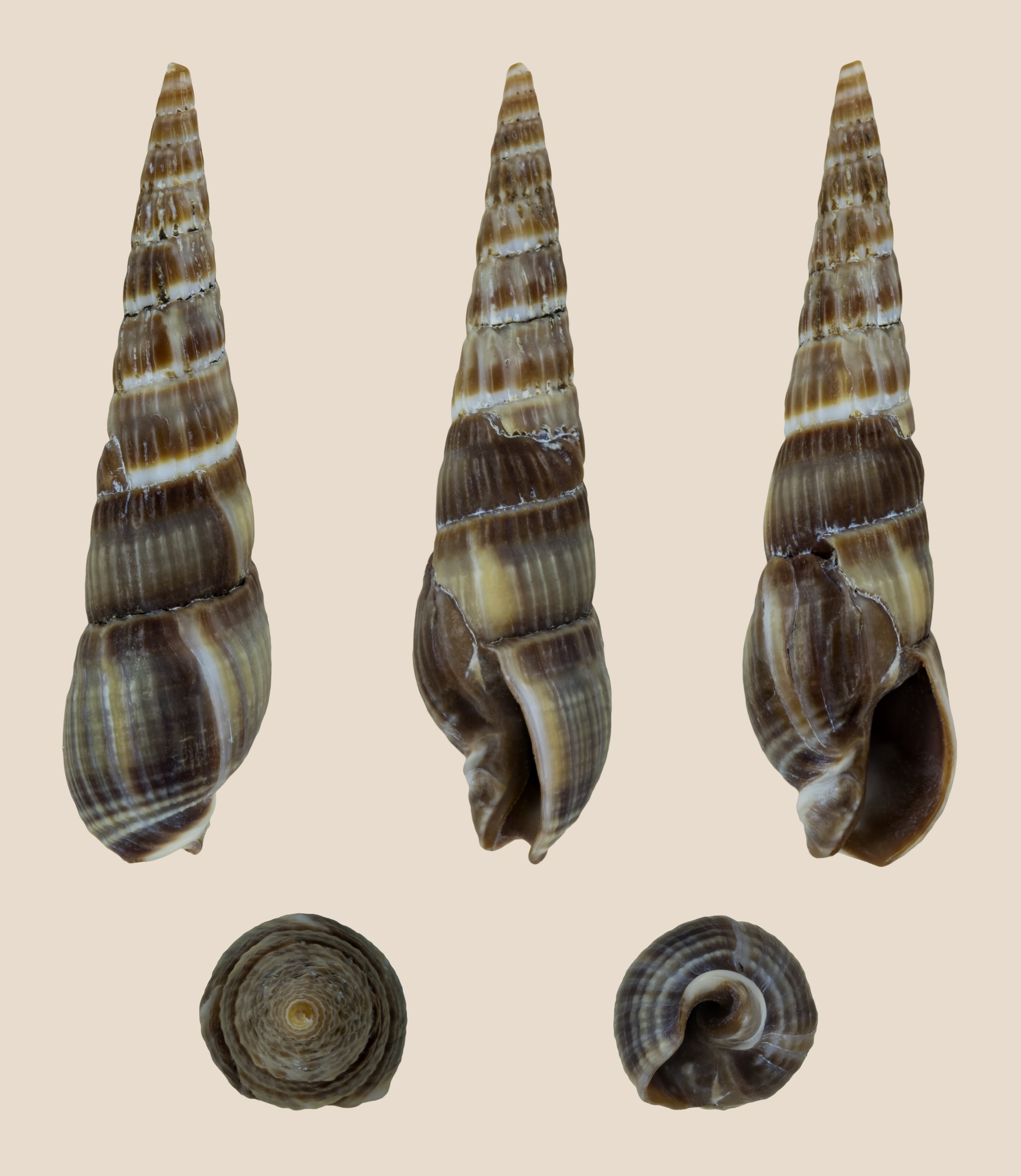

Scientific classification
- Kingdom: Animalia
- Phylum: Mollusca
- Class: Gastropoda
- Subclass: Caenogastropoda
- Order: Neogastropoda
- Superfamily: Conoidea
- Family: Terebridae
- Genus: Duplicaria
- Species: D. badia

Binomial name
- Duplicaria badia (Deshayes, 1859)

Synonyms
- Diplomeriza koreana Yoo, 1976 (original combination); Duplicaria koreana (Yoo, 1976); Terebra badia Deshayes, 1859; Terebra ligneola Reeve, 1860

= Duplicaria badia =

Species of gastropod

Duplicaria badia is a species of sea snail, a marine gastropod mollusk in the family Terebridae, the auger snails.

== Description ==
The shell size varies between 25 mm and 45 mm.

== Distribution ==
This species occurs in the Pacific Ocean off New Caledonia and Fiji.
