= Duplicaria sowerbyana =

Scientific classification
- Kingdom: Animalia
- Phylum: Mollusca
- Class: Gastropoda
- Subclass: Caenogastropoda
- Order: Neogastropoda
- Family: Terebridae
- Genus: Duplicaria
- Species: D. sowerbyana

Binomial name
- Duplicaria sowerbyana (Deshayes, 1857)

Synonyms
- Terebra sowerbyana Deshayes, 1857

Species of gastropod

Duplicaria sowerbyana is a species of sea snail, a marine gastropod mollusk in the family Terebridae, the auger snails.
