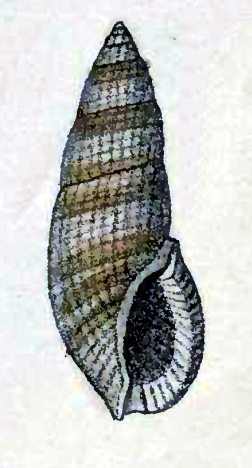
- Shell of Daphnella reeveana

Scientific classification
- Kingdom: Animalia
- Phylum: Mollusca
- Class: Gastropoda
- Subclass: Caenogastropoda
- Order: Neogastropoda
- Superfamily: Conoidea
- Family: Raphitomidae
- Genus: Daphnella
- Species: D. reeveana

Binomial name
- Daphnella reeveana (Deshayes, 1863)

Synonyms
- Clathurella reeveana (Pease, 1868); Clathurella tumida Pease, 1868; Hemidaphne tumida Pease, 1867; Pleurotoma reeveana Deshayes, 1863 (original combination); Pleurotomoides reeveana (Deshayes, 1863)

= Daphnella reeveana =

Species of gastropod

Daphnella reeveana is a species of sea snail, a marine gastropod mollusk in the family Raphitomidae.

== Description ==
The length of the shell varies between 7 mm and 9 mm.

The surface of this shell is almost microscopically decussated, the spiral sculpture being generally the strongest. The color of the shell is whitish, with light chestnut revolving lines, irregularly distributed, approximating or distant.

== Distribution ==
This marine species occurs off Réunion, Mauritius and the Andaman Islands.
