= Northia =

Northia can refer to:

== Taxonomy ==
- Northia (gastropod), a genus of sea snails in the family Nassariidae
- Northia (plant), a genus of plants in the family Sapotaceae
