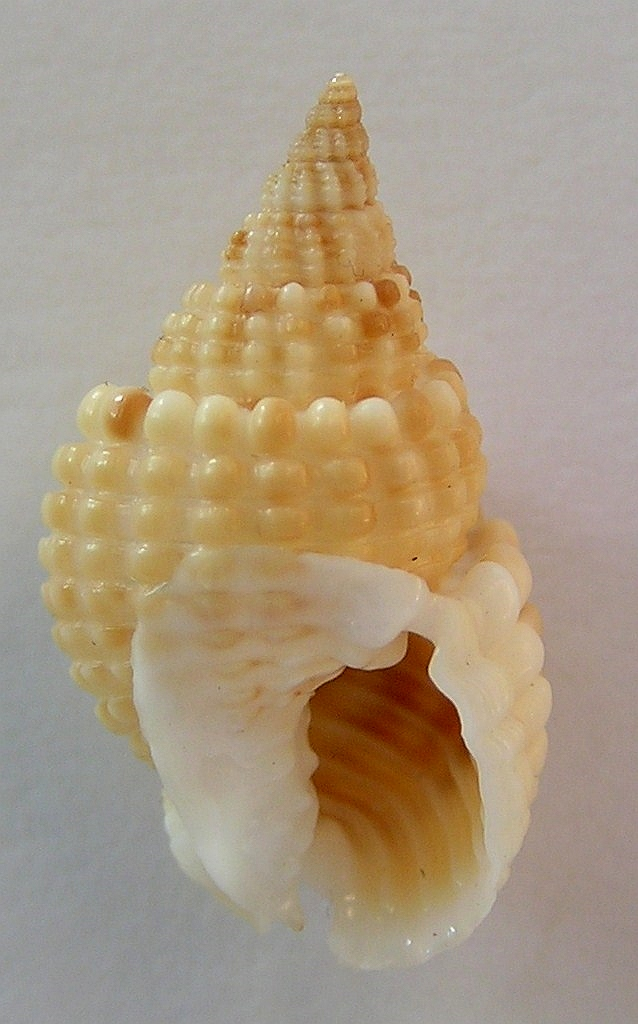
- Apertural view of Nassarius conoidalis

Scientific classification
- Kingdom: Animalia
- Phylum: Mollusca
- Class: Gastropoda
- Subclass: Caenogastropoda
- Order: Neogastropoda
- Family: Nassariidae
- Genus: Nassarius
- Species: N. conoidalis

Binomial name
- Nassarius conoidalis (Deshayes in Belanger, 1832)

Synonyms
- See list of synonyms

= Nassarius conoidalis =

Species of gastropod

Nassarius conoidalis, common name the cone-shaped nassa or the jewelled dog whelk, is a species of sea snail, a marine gastropod mollusc in the family Nassariidae, the nassa mud snails.

== List of synonyms ==
- Buccinum clathratum Wood, 1825 (invalid: junior homonym of Buccinum clathratum Born, 1778)
- Buccinum conoidale Deshayes in Belanger, 1832 (original combination)
- Buccinum gemmulatum Lamarck, 1822 (invalid: junior homonym of Buccinum gemmulatum Wood, 1818)
- Desmoulea ringens A. Adams, 1855
- Nassa (Niotha) gemmulata (Lamarck, 1822)
- Nassa (Niotha) gemmulata var. variegata A. Adams, 1852
- † Nassa (Niotha) rajaensis K. Martin, 1895
- Nassa clathrata Lamarck, 1816 (invalid: junior secondary homonym of Buccinum clathratum Born, 1778)
- Nassa cumingii A. Adams, 1852
- Nassa gemmulata (Lamarck, 1822)
- Nassa ringens Reeve, 1854 (invalid: junior homonym of Nassa ringens Michelotti, 1847)
- Nassa variegata A. Adams, 1852
- Nassa verrucosa A. Adams, 1852 (invalid: junior secondary homonym of Buccinum verrucosum Bruguière, 1789)
- Nassarius (Niotha) clathratus (Lamarck, 1822)
- Nassarius (Niotha) conoidalis (Deshayes in Belanger, 1832) accepted, alternate representation
- Nassarius (Niotha) gemmulatus (Lamarck, 1822)
- Nassarius (Niotha) gemmulatus var. variegatus (A. Adams, 1852)
- Nassarius (Niotha) gemmulatus var. verrucosa (A. Adams, 1852)
- Nassarius (Niotha) variegatus (A. Adams, 1852)
- Nassarius (Niotha) verrucosus (A. Adams, 1852)
- Nassarius comtessei (Iredale, 1929)
- Nassarius conoidalis conoidalis (Deshayes in Belanger, 1832)
- Nassarius gemmulatus (Lamarck, 1822)
- Niotha clathrata (Lamarck, 1816)
- Niotha clathratus (Lamarck, 1816)
- Niotha comtessei Iredale, 1929
- Niotha cumingii A. Adams, 1870
- Niotha gemmulata (Lamarck, 1822)

== Description ==
The shell size varies between 16 mm and 32 mm

The shell has an ovate, ventricose shape. The pointed spire is composed of six or seven convex whorls. It is ornamented upon its whole surface with granular, longitudinal folds, and transverse striae. The suture is very distinct, formed by a small canal, and bordered with closer tubercles, principally upon the body whorl. This is very much inflated, and composes almost half of the shell. The aperture is rounded. The thin outer lip is arcuated. It is folded upon the edge, ornamented internally with raised striae, which are continued within the shell. The inner lip expands upon the columella, which is truncated towards the top, and extends like a raised lip towards the base. It is covered lengthwise by two or three slightly marked, oblique folds. The interior of this shell is of a diaphanous white, like the surface, which, moreover, is covered with reddish clouds.

== Distribution ==
This species occurs in the Red Sea, the Gulf of Oman, The Persian Gulf, in the Indian Ocean off East Africa, South Africa and Mozambique; and in the South Chinese Sea off the coast of Vietnam; off Indonesia and Australia (New South Wales, Northern Territory, Queensland, Western Australia).
