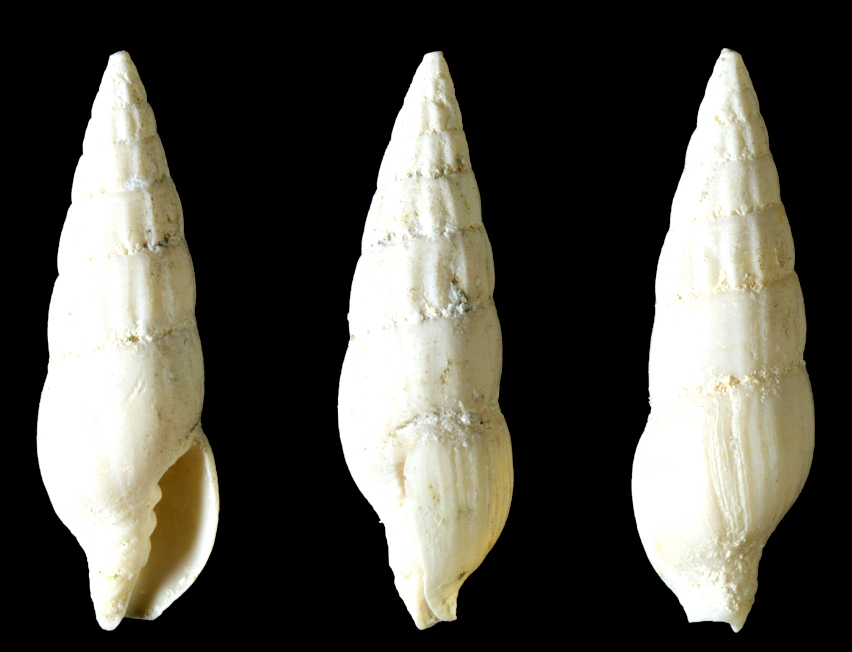
- Shell of † Vexillum barbieri (specimen at MNHN, Paris)

Scientific classification
- Kingdom: Animalia
- Phylum: Mollusca
- Class: Gastropoda
- Subclass: Caenogastropoda
- Order: Neogastropoda
- Superfamily: Turbinelloidea
- Family: Costellariidae
- Genus: Vexillum
- Species: V. barbieri

Binomial name
- Vexillum barbieri (Deshayes, 1865)

Synonyms
- † Mitra barbieri Deshayes, 1865 superseded combination; † Vexillum (Uromitra) barbieri (Deshayes, 1865) superseded combination

= Vexillum barbieri =

Species of gastropod

Vexillum barbieri is an extinct species of sea snail, a marine gastropod mollusk, in the family Costellariidae, the ribbed miters.

== Distribution ==
Fossils of this marine species were found in Eocene strata in Normandy, France.
