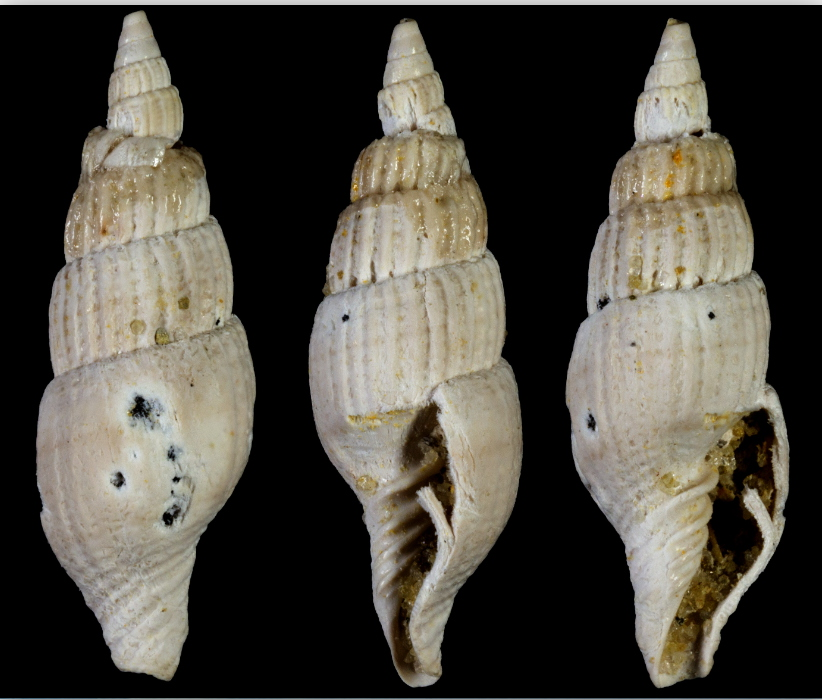
- Shell of † Vexillum aizyense (specimen at MNHN, Paris)

Scientific classification
- Kingdom: Animalia
- Phylum: Mollusca
- Class: Gastropoda
- Subclass: Caenogastropoda
- Order: Neogastropoda
- Superfamily: Turbinelloidea
- Family: Costellariidae
- Genus: Vexillum
- Species: V. aizyense

Binomial name
- Vexillum aizyense (Deshayes, 1865)

Synonyms
- † Mitra aizyense Deshayes, 1865 superseded combination; † Turricula (Fusimitra) aizyensis Deshayes, 1865; † Vexillum (Uromitra) aizyense (Deshayes, 1865) superseded combination

= Vexillum aizyense =

Species of gastropod

Vexillum aizyense is an extinct species of sea snail, a marine gastropod mollusk, in the family Costellariidae, the ribbed miters.

== Distribution ==
Fossils of this marine species were found in Eocene strata in Picardy, France.
