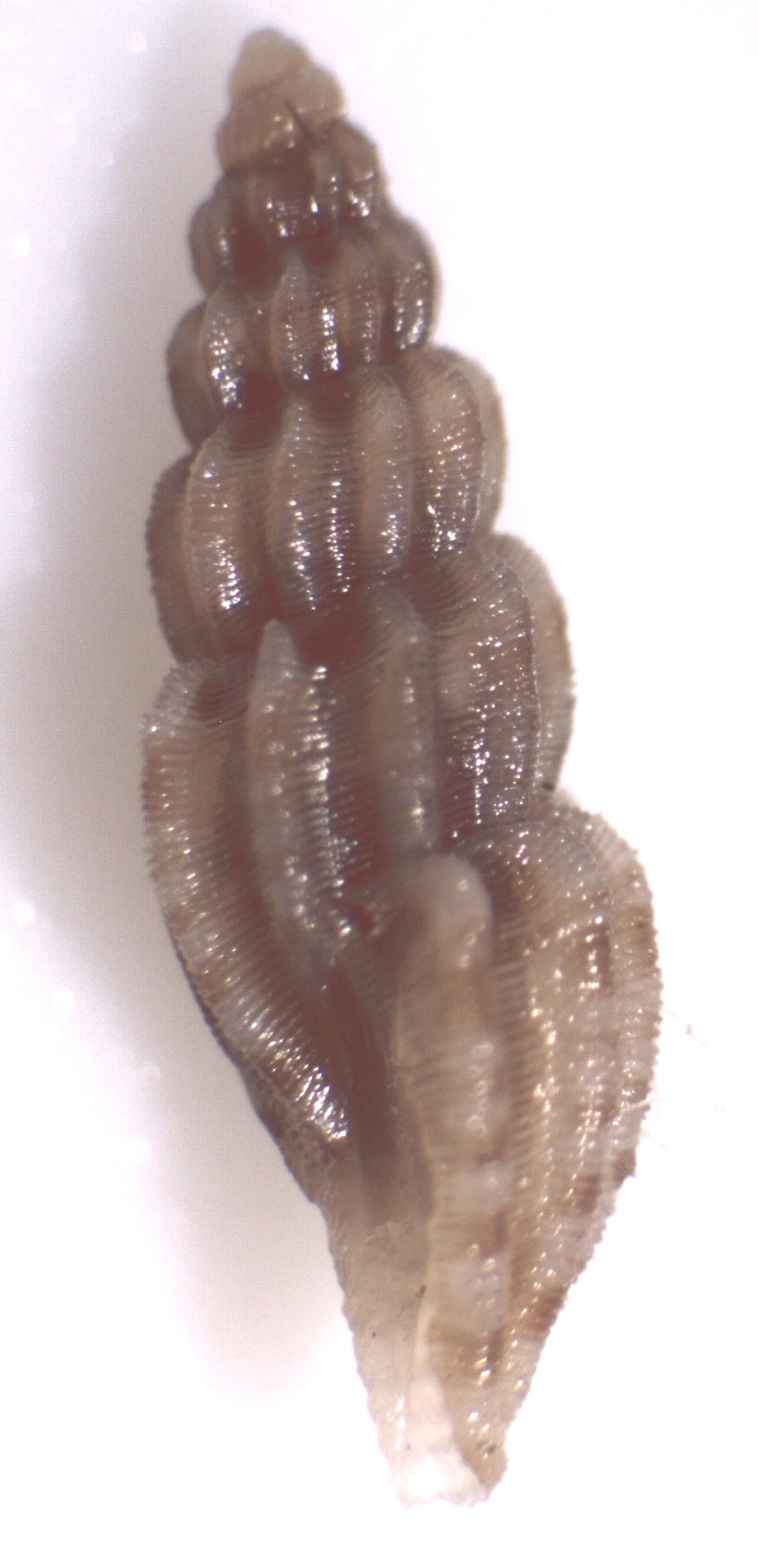
- Mangelia multilineolata

Scientific classification
- Kingdom: Animalia
- Phylum: Mollusca
- Class: Gastropoda
- Subclass: Caenogastropoda
- Order: Neogastropoda
- Superfamily: Conoidea
- Family: Mangeliidae
- Genus: Mangelia
- Species: M. multilineolata

Binomial name
- Mangelia multilineolata (Deshayes, 1835)

Synonyms
- Cythara galli Bivona-Bernardi, Ant. & And. Bivona-Bernardi, 1838; Fusus lineatus Brown, C.T., 1827; Mangelia bivonae C. Maravigna, 1840; Mangelia bivoniana C. Maravigna, 1853; Mangelia interlineata W. Kobelt, 1905; Mangelia lineatus T. Brown, 1827; Mangelia lineolata Risso, A., 1826; Mangelia pusilla A. Scacchi, 1836; Mangelia subecaudata And. Bivona-Bernardi, 1838; Mangelia (Mangiliella) multilineolata alboventrosa (f) Nordsieck, F., 1977; Mangiliella multilineolata (Deshayes, 1835); Pleurotoma bivonae Maravigna, C., 1840; Pleurotoma bivoniana Maravigna, C., 1853; Pleurotoma multilineolata G.P. Deshayes, 1835; Pleurotoma pusilla Scacchi, A., 1836; Pleurotoma subecaudata Bivona-Bernardi, Ant. & And. Bivona-Bernardi, 1838

= Mangelia multilineolata =

Species of gastropod

Mangelia multilineolata is a species of sea snail, a marine gastropod mollusk in the family Mangeliidae.

== Description ==
The size of an adult shell varies between 4 mm and 10 mm.

The shell contains rather numerous longitudinal ribs, close together, curved white, with chestnut, revolving lines, rarely unicolored or unifasciate.

== Distribution ==
This species occurs in the Mediterranean Sea and in the Atlantic Ocean off the Azores.
