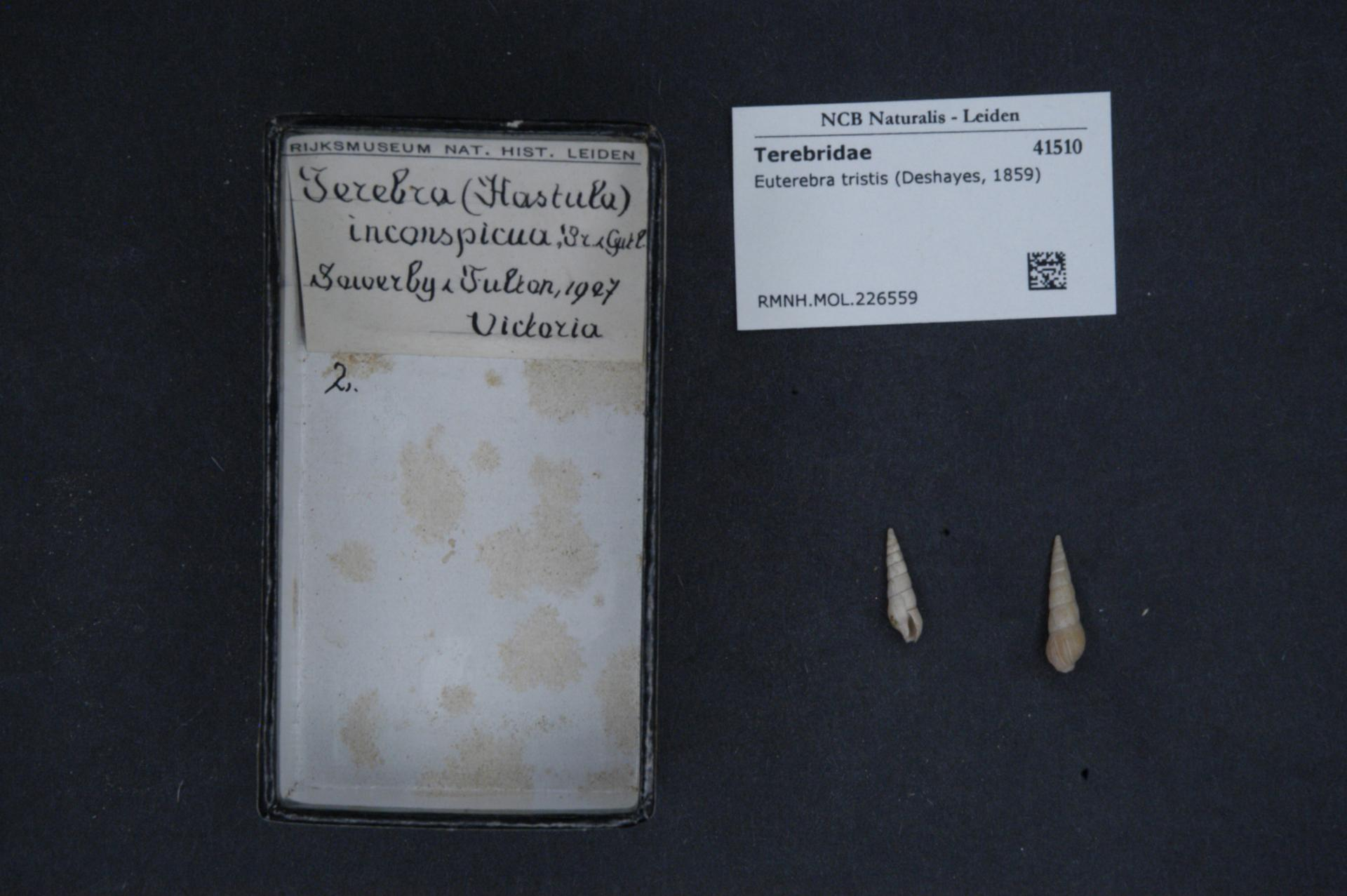
- Naturalis Biodiversity Center - RMNH.MOL.226559 - Euterebra tristis (Deshayes, 1859) - Terebridae - Mollusc shell

Scientific classification
- Kingdom: Animalia
- Phylum: Mollusca
- Class: Gastropoda
- Subclass: Caenogastropoda
- Order: Neogastropoda
- Family: Terebridae
- Genus: Duplicaria
- Species: D. tristis

Binomial name
- Duplicaria tristis (Deshayes, 1859)

Synonyms
- Acus antarcticus E.A. Smith, 1873; Acus assimilis Angas, 1867; Acus bicolor Angas, 1867; Cerithium kirki Hutton, 1873; Duplicaria flexicostata (Suter, 1909); Duplicaria propelevis (Ponder, 1868); Euterebra tristis (Deshayes, 1859); Pervicacia bicolor (Angas, 1867); Pervicacia bicolor bicolor (Angas, 1867); Pervicacia bicolor subplicata (Cotton, 1976); Pervicacia mariae Powell, 1940; Pervicacia propelevis Ponder, 1968; Pervicacia subplicata Cotton, 1952; Pervicacia tristis (Deshayes, 1859); Terebra flexicostata Suter, 1909; Terebra inconspicua Pritchard & Gatliff, 1902; Terebra tristis Deshayes, 1859; Terebra tristis crassicostata Suter, 1909

= Duplicaria tristis =

Species of gastropod

Duplicaria tristis is a species of sea snail, a marine gastropod mollusk in the family Terebridae, the auger snails.
