= Duplicaria bernardii =

Scientific classification
- Kingdom: Animalia
- Phylum: Mollusca
- Class: Gastropoda
- Subclass: Caenogastropoda
- Order: Neogastropoda
- Family: Terebridae
- Genus: Duplicaria
- Species: D. bernardii

Binomial name
- Duplicaria bernardii (Deshayes, 1857)

Synonyms
- Duplicaria bernardi [sic] (misspelling); Duplicaria vallesia Hedley, 1912 (synonym); Terebra addita Deshayes, 1859; Terebra bernardii Deshayes, 1857 (original combination)

Species of gastropod

Duplicaria bernardii is a species of sea snail, a marine gastropod mollusk in the family Terebridae, the auger snails.

== Distribution ==
Australia, New South Wales, Trial Bay (Hedley, 1912).
