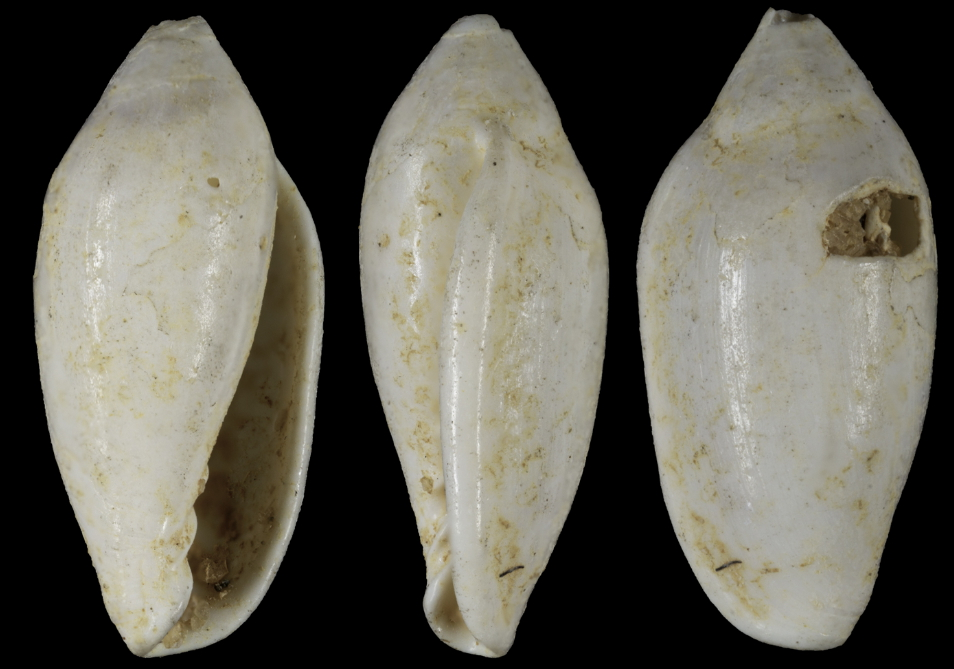
- Shell of Volvarina cylindracea (specimen at MNHN, Paris)

Scientific classification
- Kingdom: Animalia
- Phylum: Mollusca
- Class: Gastropoda
- Subclass: Caenogastropoda
- Order: Neogastropoda
- Family: Marginellidae
- Subfamily: Marginellinae
- Genus: Volvarina
- Species: †V. cylindracea

Binomial name
- †Volvarina cylindracea (Deshayes, 1865)

Synonyms
- † Marginella cylindracea Deshayes, 1865; † Marginella (Volvarina) vaquezi Cossmann, 1906; † Volvarina vaquezi Cossmann, 1906

= Volvarina cylindracea =

Species of gastropod

Volvarina cylindracea is an extinct species of sea snail, a marine gastropod mollusk in the family Marginellidae, the margin snails.

== Description ==
The length of the shell attains 8 mm, its diameter 3 mm.

(Original description) The cylindrical shell is elongated, thin and fragile. The protoconch is short and obtuse. The shell consists of four whorls growing fairly quickly and barely convex. They are not very visible in most individuals, covered as they are with a glazed, quite thick layer. The body whorl is about three times as long as the rest of the spire. It is elongated, slightly pot-bellied and moderately attenuated in front. It is more cylindrical than in all the other species. The aperture is very elongated and in proportion wider than in related species. It widens gradually From the posterior angle to its anterior extremity. It is even a little dilated in the middle. The straight outer lip is moderately thickened, and this thickening is equally shared between the outer bead and that which narrows the aperture. This edge projects forward by describing the curve of a fairly large circle. It attaches quite high on the penultimate turn, which deflects the last portion of the suture backwards. The columella is slightly concave. It has four oblique plicae, remarkable for their thinness and their spacing.

== Distribution ==
Fossils of this marine species were found in Eocene strata in Île-de-France, France.
