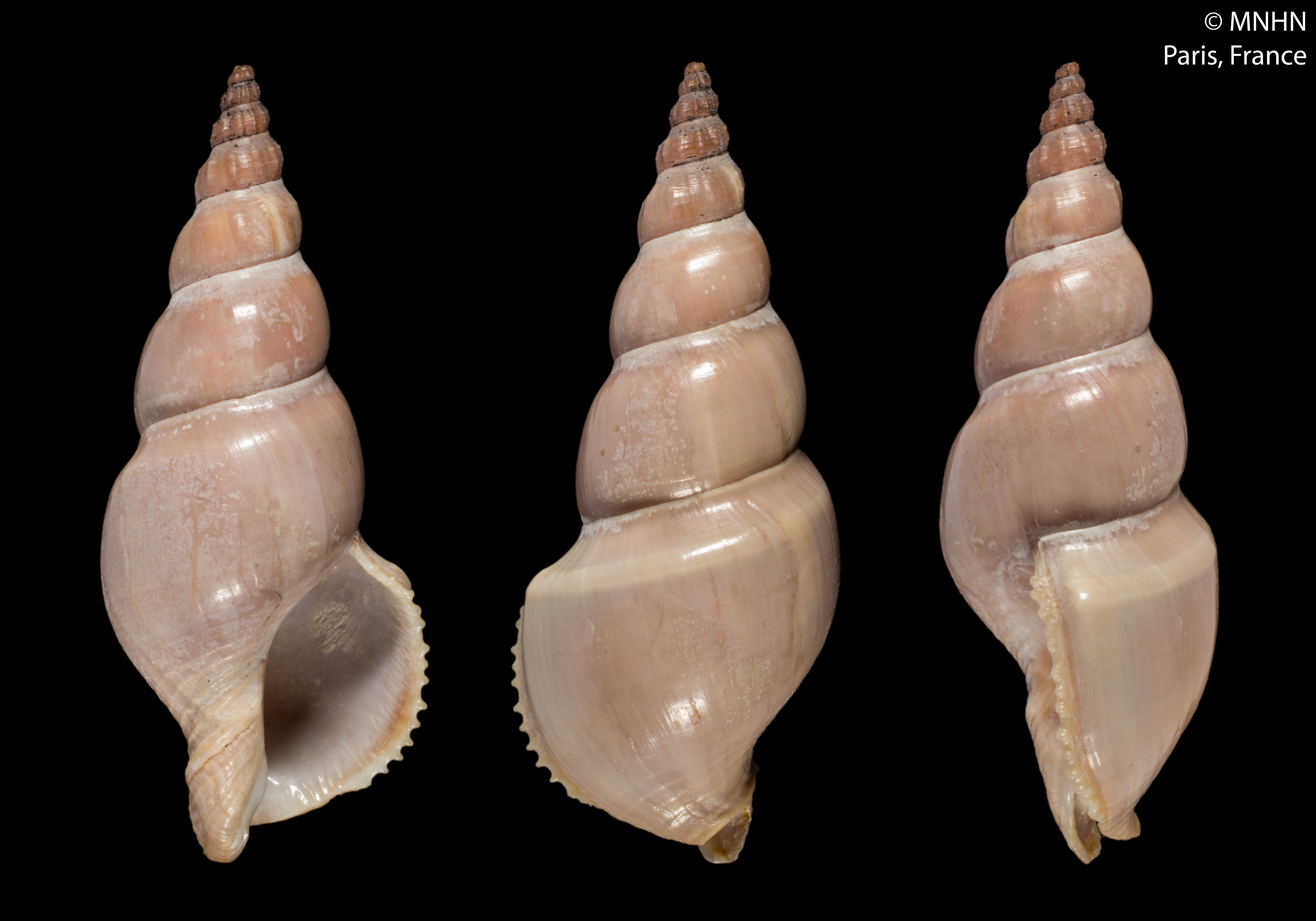

Scientific classification
- Kingdom: Animalia
- Phylum: Mollusca
- Class: Gastropoda
- Subclass: Caenogastropoda
- Order: Neogastropoda
- Superfamily: Buccinoidea
- Family: Nassariidae
- Genus: Northia
- Species: N. pristis

Binomial name
- Northia pristis (Deshayes, 1844)

Synonyms
- Buccinum pristis Deshayes, 1844; Buccinum serratum Kiener, 1834

= Northia pristis =

Species of sea snail

Northia pristis is a species of sea snail within the family Nassariidae.

== Habitat ==
It lives in benthic environments, scavenging on molluscs, polychaetes, and dead organic material.

== Distribution ==
Its distribution covers the Pacific Ocean near countries spanning from the United States to Ecuador.
