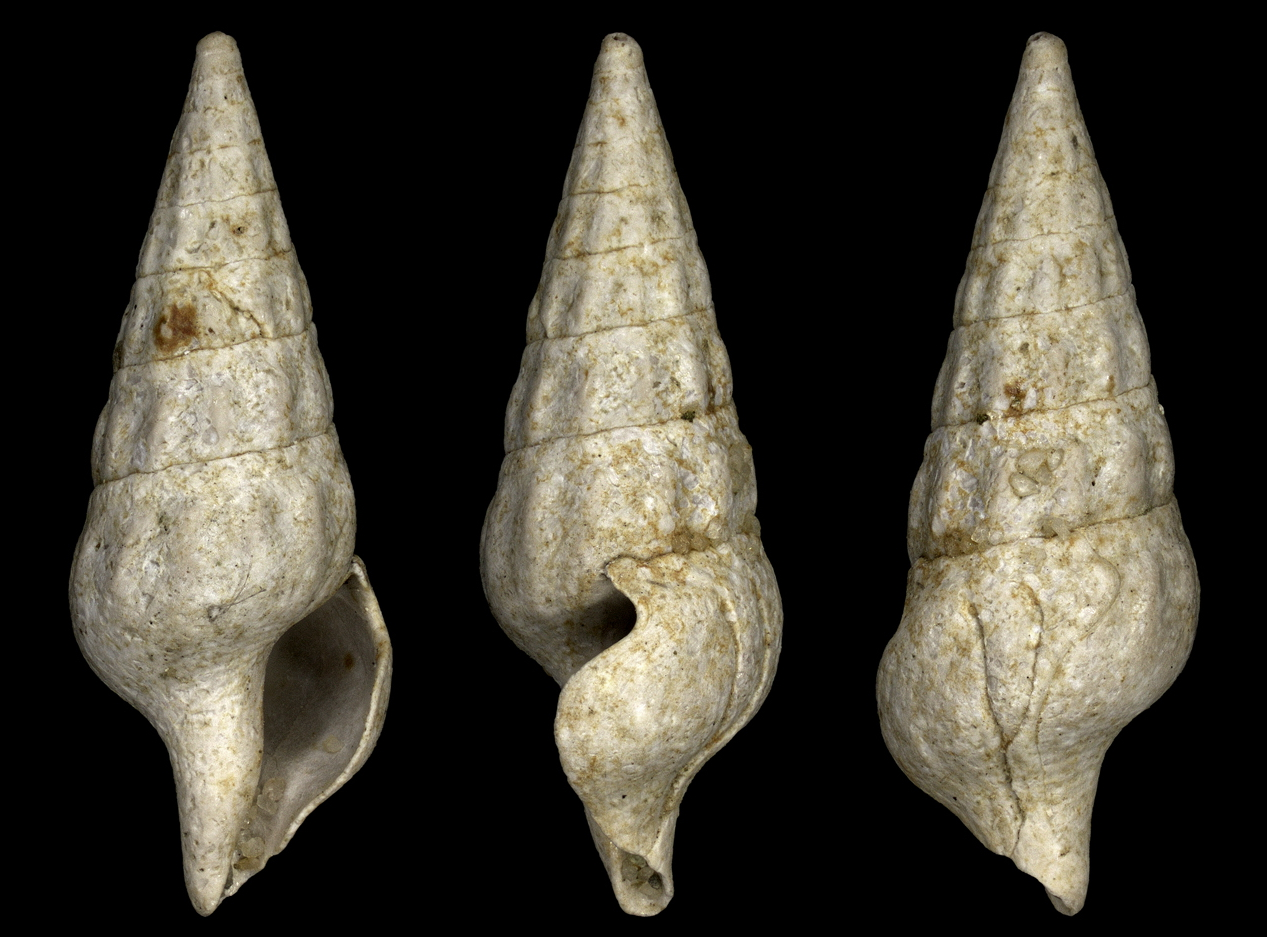
- Shells of Crassispira raricostulata (specimens at MNHN, Paris)

Scientific classification
- Kingdom: Animalia
- Phylum: Mollusca
- Class: Gastropoda
- Subclass: Caenogastropoda
- Order: Neogastropoda
- Superfamily: Conoidea
- Family: Pseudomelatomidae
- Genus: Crassispira
- Species: C. raricostulata

Binomial name
- Crassispira raricostulata (Deshayes, 1865)

= Crassispira raricostulata =

Extinct species of gastropod

Crassispira raricostulata is an extinct species of sea snail, a marine gastropod mollusk in the family Pseudomelatomidae, the turrids and allies.

== Distribution ==
Fossils have been found in Eocene strata in Picardy, France.
