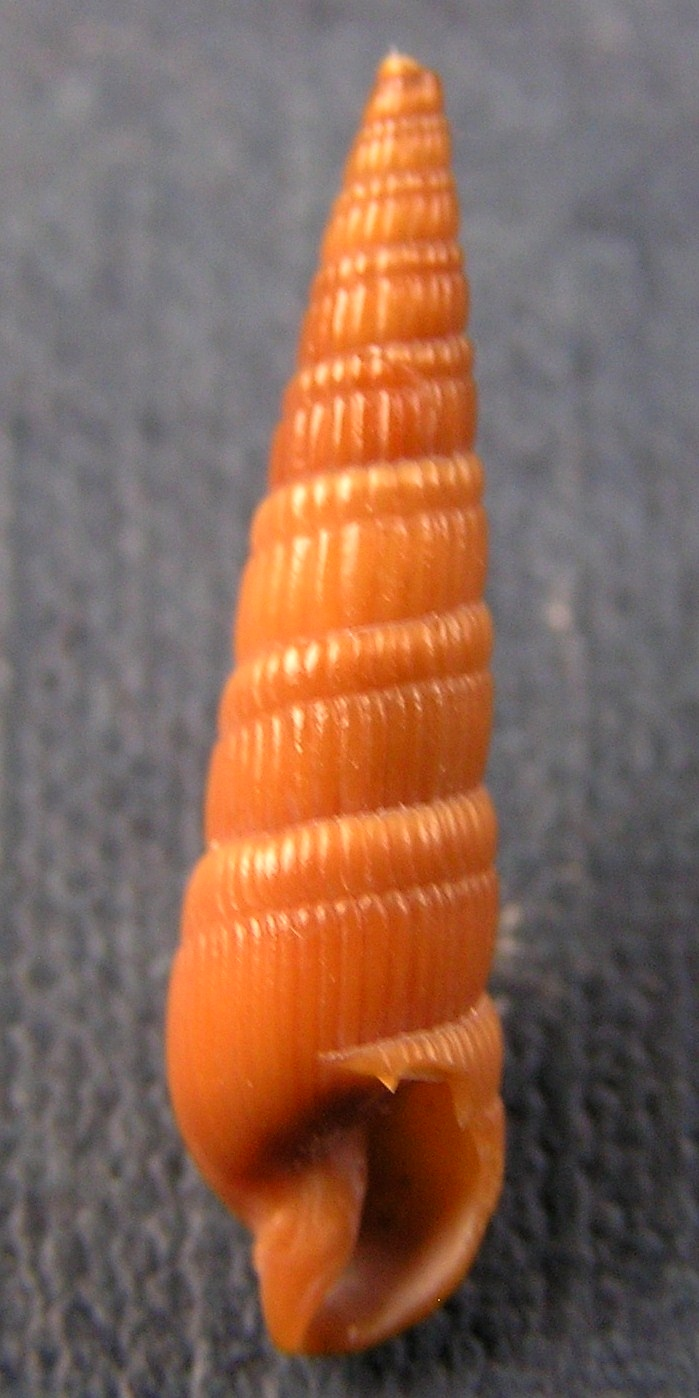

Scientific classification
- Kingdom: Animalia
- Phylum: Mollusca
- Class: Gastropoda
- Subclass: Caenogastropoda
- Order: Neogastropoda
- Family: Terebridae
- Genus: Duplicaria
- Species: D. kieneri

Binomial name
- Duplicaria kieneri (Deshayes, 1859)

Synonyms
- Pervicacia kieneri (Deshayes, 1859); Terebra duplicata var. junior Kiener, 1839; Terebra kieneri Deshayes, 1859

= Duplicaria kieneri =

Species of sea snail

Duplicaria kieneri is a species of sea snail, a marine gastropod mollusk in the family Terebridae, the auger snails.
