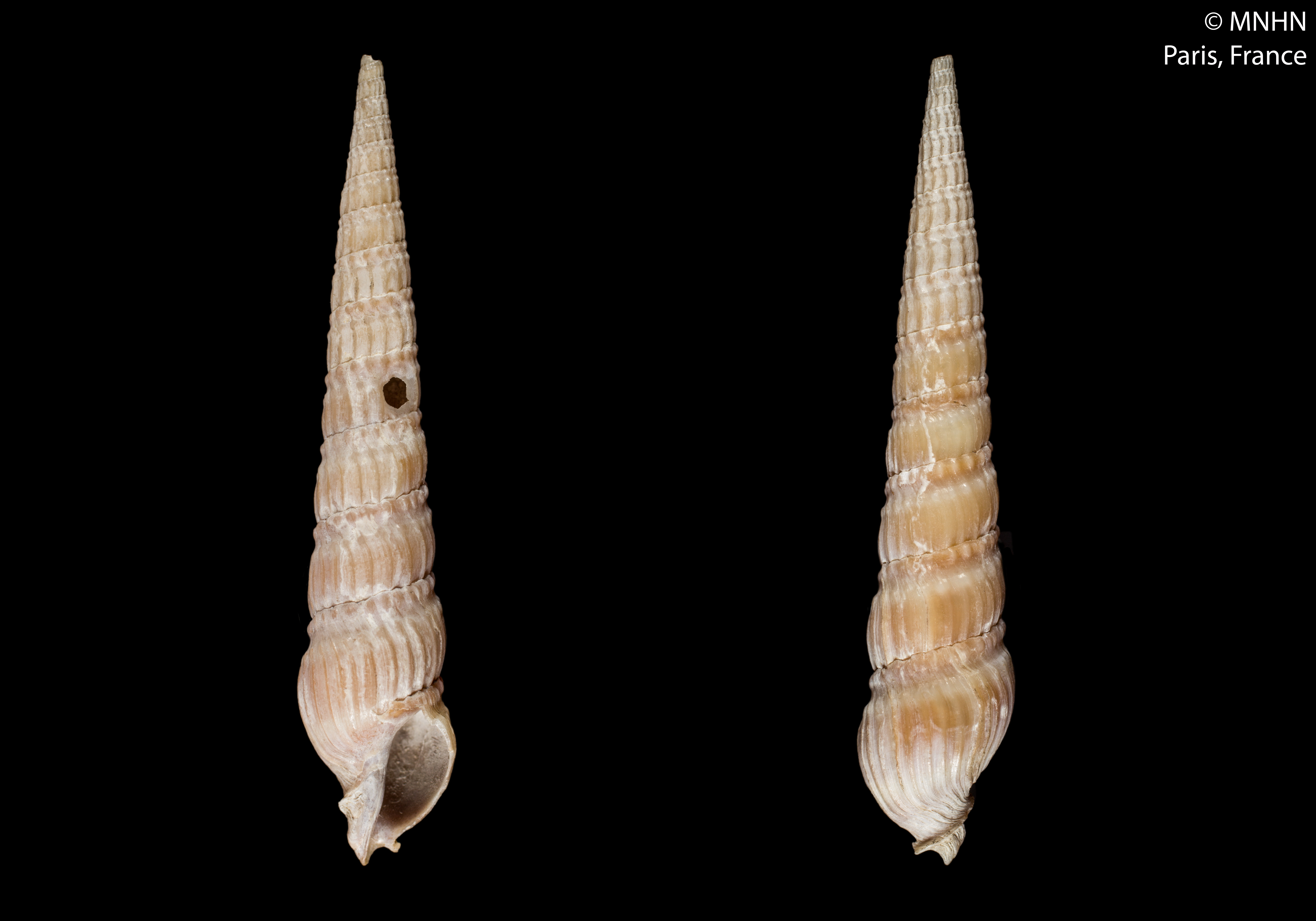

Scientific classification
- Kingdom: Animalia
- Phylum: Mollusca
- Class: Gastropoda
- Subclass: Caenogastropoda
- Order: Neogastropoda
- Family: Terebridae
- Genus: Duplicaria
- Species: D. gemmulata

Binomial name
- Duplicaria gemmulata (Kiener, 1839)

Synonyms
- Terebra chilensis Deshayes, 1859; Terebra gemmulata Kiener, 1839; Terebra patagonica d'Orbigny, 1839

= Duplicaria gemmulata =

Species of gastropod

Duplicaria gemmulata is a species of sea snail, a marine gastropod mollusk in the family Terebridae, the auger snails.

== See also ==
- Duplicaria (gastropod)
