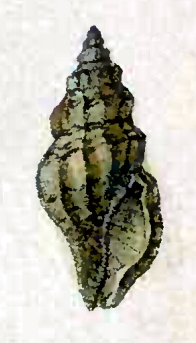
- Drawing of a shell of Mangelia taeniata

Scientific classification
- Kingdom: Animalia
- Phylum: Mollusca
- Class: Gastropoda
- Subclass: Caenogastropoda
- Order: Neogastropoda
- Superfamily: Conoidea
- Family: Mangeliidae
- Genus: Mangelia
- Species: M. taeniata

Binomial name
- Mangelia taeniata (Deshayes, 1835)

Synonyms
- Mangelia eburnea And. Bivona-Bernardi, 1838; Mangelia taeniata L.A. Reeve, 1846; Mangiliella taeniata (Deshayes, 1835); Pleurotoma eburnea And. Bivona-Bernardi, 1838; Pleurotoma taeniata G.P. Deshayes, 1835 (original combination); Pleurotoma teniata G.P. Deshayes, 1835

= Mangelia taeniata =

Species of gastropod

Mangelia taeniata, common name the filleted mangelia, is a species of sea snail, a marine gastropod mollusk in the family Mangeliidae.

== Subspecies ==
- Mangelia taeniata major É.A.A. Locard & E. Caziot, 1900
- Mangelia taeniata nivea (J.E. Cooper & H.B. Preston, 1910)

== Description ==
The length of the shell varies between 4 mm and 7 mm.

The smooth, oblong fusiform shell has shouldered whorls. It is longitudinally plicately ribbed. Its color is whitish or yellowish brown, with conspicuous narrow brown revolving lines.

== Distribution ==
This species occurs in the Mediterranean Sea off Apulia, Italy, and off Malta, Greece and Turkey; in the Atlantic Ocean off the Canary Islands.
