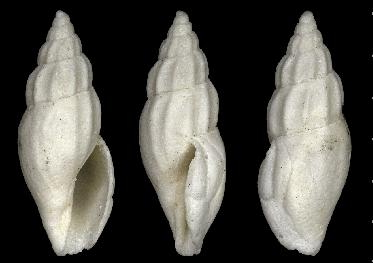
- Shell of †Mangelia semicostulata (specimen at MNHN, Paris)

Scientific classification
- Kingdom: Animalia
- Phylum: Mollusca
- Class: Gastropoda
- Subclass: Caenogastropoda
- Order: Neogastropoda
- Superfamily: Conoidea
- Family: Mangeliidae
- Genus: Mangelia
- Species: M. semicostulata

Binomial name
- Mangelia semicostulata (Deshayes, 1865)

Synonyms
- † Mangilia costulata Deshayes, 1865

= Mangelia semicostulata =

Extinct species of gastropod

Mangelia semicostulata is an extinct species of sea snail, a marine gastropod mollusk in the family Mangeliidae.

== Description ==
The length of the shell attains 7 mm.

== Distribution ==
This extinct marine species was found in Eocene strata of Normandy, France.
