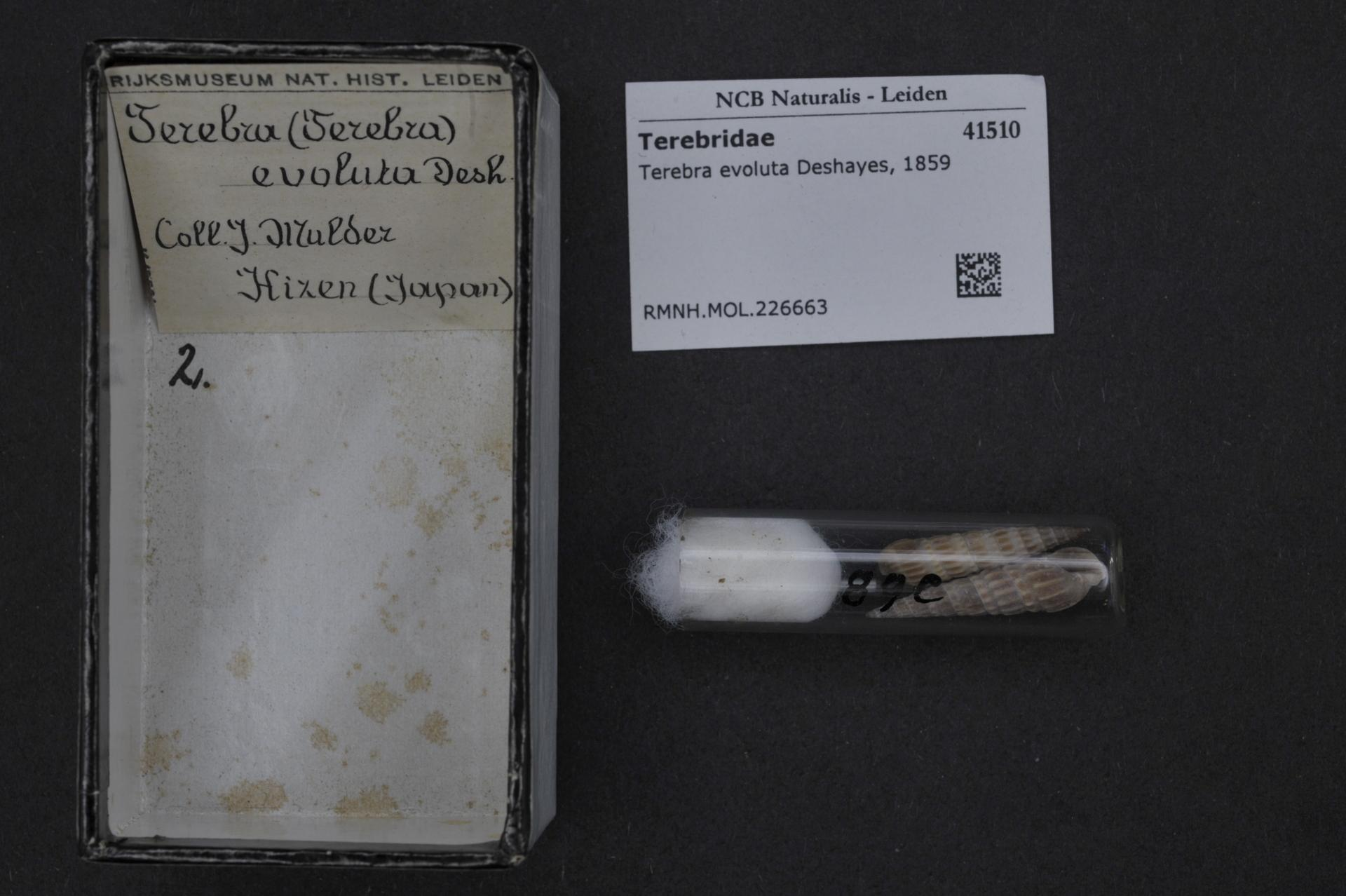

Scientific classification
- Kingdom: Animalia
- Phylum: Mollusca
- Class: Gastropoda
- Subclass: Caenogastropoda
- Order: Neogastropoda
- Superfamily: Conoidea
- Family: Terebridae
- Genus: Duplicaria
- Species: D. evoluta

Binomial name
- Duplicaria evoluta (Deshayes, 1859)

Synonyms
- Duplicaria hiradoensis (Pilsbry, 1921) ·; Noditerebra evoluta (Deshayes, 1859); Terebra dussumieri hiradoensis Pilsbry, 1921 ·; Terebra evoluta Deshayes, 1859 (original combination)

= Duplicaria evoluta =

Species of gastropod

Duplicaria evoluta is a species of sea snail, a marine gastropod mollusk in the family Terebridae, the auger snails.
