= D. australis =

D. australis may refer to:

- Delma australis, a lizard species in the genus Delma
- Diospyros australis, a shrub or small tree species found in Australia
- Dryococelus australis, the Lord Howe Island stick insect, an insect species found on the Lord Howe Island Group
- Duplicaria australis, a sea snail species
- Dusicyon australis, the Falkland Islands wolf or warrah, an extinct land mammal species found only on the Falkland Islands

== See also ==
- Australis (disambiguation)
