= Duplicaria juliae =

Scientific classification
- Kingdom: Animalia
- Phylum: Mollusca
- Class: Gastropoda
- Subclass: Caenogastropoda
- Order: Neogastropoda
- Family: Terebridae
- Genus: Duplicaria
- Species: D. juliae

Binomial name
- Duplicaria juliae (Aubry, 1999)

Synonyms
- Terebra juliae Aubry, 1999

Species of sea snail

Duplicaria juliae is a species of sea snail, a marine gastropod mollusk in the family Terebridae, the auger snails.
