= Duplicaria similis =

Scientific classification
- Kingdom: Animalia
- Phylum: Mollusca
- Class: Gastropoda
- Subclass: Caenogastropoda
- Order: Neogastropoda
- Family: Terebridae
- Genus: Duplicaria
- Species: D. similis

Binomial name
- Duplicaria similis (Smith, 1873)

Synonyms
- Terebra similis Smith, 1873

Species of gastropod

Duplicaria similis is a species of sea snail, a marine gastropod mollusk in the family Terebridae, the auger snails.
