= Duplicaria costellifera =

Scientific classification
- Kingdom: Animalia
- Phylum: Mollusca
- Class: Gastropoda
- Subclass: Caenogastropoda
- Order: Neogastropoda
- Family: Terebridae
- Genus: Duplicaria
- Species: D. costellifera

Binomial name
- Duplicaria costellifera (Pease, 1869)

Synonyms
- Acus thaanumi (Pilsbry, 1921); Duplicaria thaanumi Pilsbry, 1921; Oxymeris costellifera (Pease, 1869); Terebra costellifera Pease, 1869 (original combination); Terebra thaanumi Pilsbry, 1921

Species of gastropod

Duplicaria costellifera, common name Thaanum's auger, is a species of sea snail, a marine gastropod mollusk in the family Terebridae, subfamily Pervicaciinae, the auger snails.

== Description ==
The size of an adult shell varies between 33.8 mm and 95 mm.

== Distribution ==
This species is found in the Pacific Ocean off Hawaii.
