= Duplicaria kirai =

Scientific classification
- Kingdom: Animalia
- Phylum: Mollusca
- Class: Gastropoda
- Subclass: Caenogastropoda
- Order: Neogastropoda
- Family: Terebridae
- Genus: Duplicaria
- Species: D. kirai

Binomial name
- Duplicaria kirai (Oyama, 1962)

Synonyms
- Noditerebra kirai Oyama, 1962

Species of sea snail

Duplicaria kirai is a species of sea snail, a marine gastropod mollusk in the family Terebridae, the auger snails.
