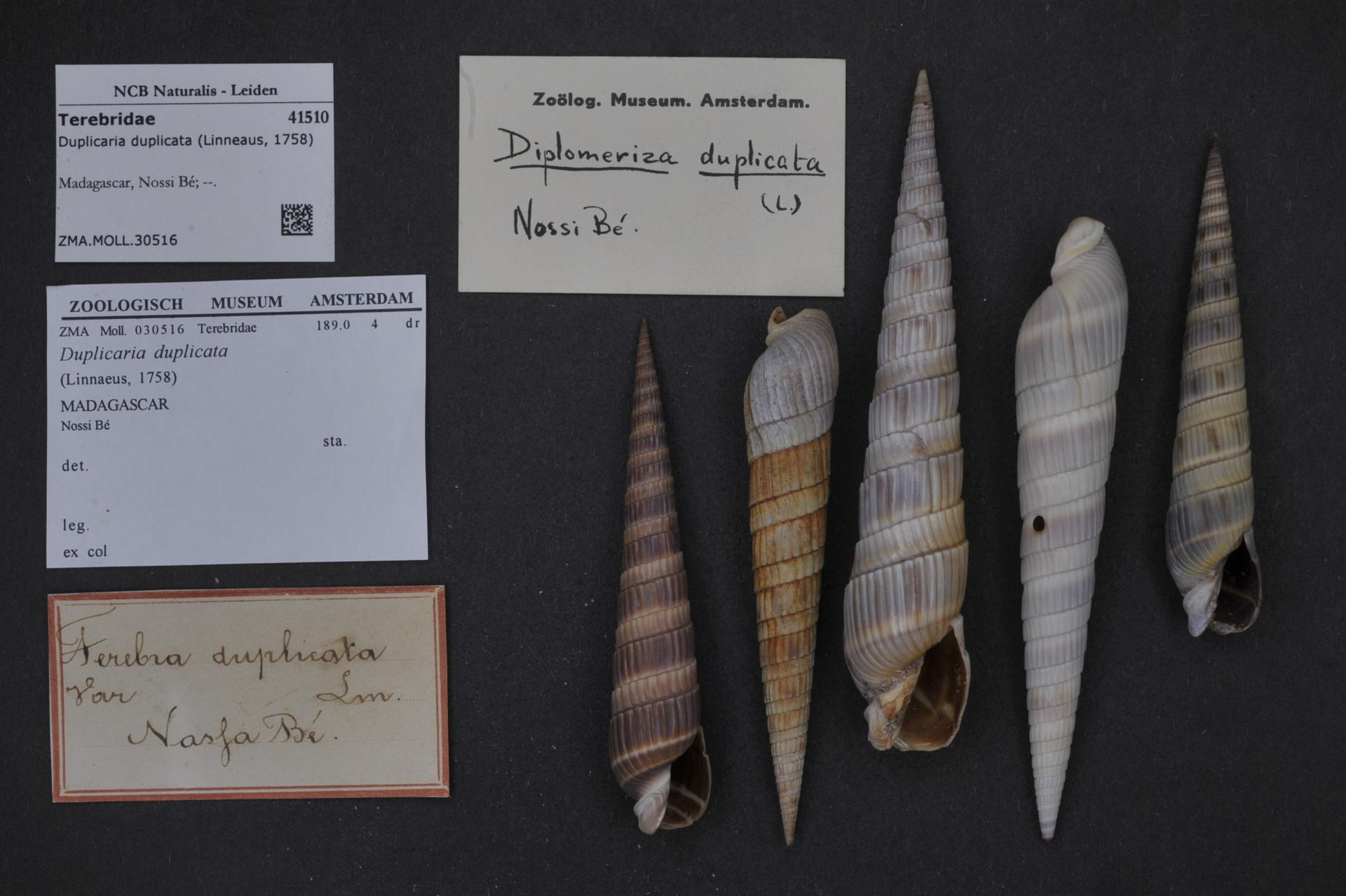

Scientific classification
- Kingdom: Animalia
- Phylum: Mollusca
- Class: Gastropoda
- Subclass: Caenogastropoda
- Order: Neogastropoda
- Family: Terebridae
- Genus: Duplicaria
- Species: D. duplicata

Binomial name
- Duplicaria duplicata (Linnaeus, 1758)

Synonyms
- Buccinum duplicatum Linnaeus, 1758; Diplomeriza duplicata (Linnaeus, 1758); Myurella duplicatoides Bartsch, 1923; Noditerebra duplicata (Linnaeus, 1758); Terebra duplicata (Linnaeus, 1758); Terebra lamarckii Kiener, 1839; Terebra reevei Deshayes, 1857; Vertagus duplicatus (Linnaeus, 1758)

= Duplicaria duplicata =

Species of gastropod

Duplicaria duplicata, commonly referred to as the duplicate auger, is a species of sea snail, a marine gastropod mollusk in the family Terebridae, the auger snails.

== Description ==
The size of the shell varies between 20 mm and 93 mm.

== Distribution ==
This marine species occurs in the Red Sea, in the Indian Ocean off Madagascar and Tanzania; off Japan and the Solomon Islands.
