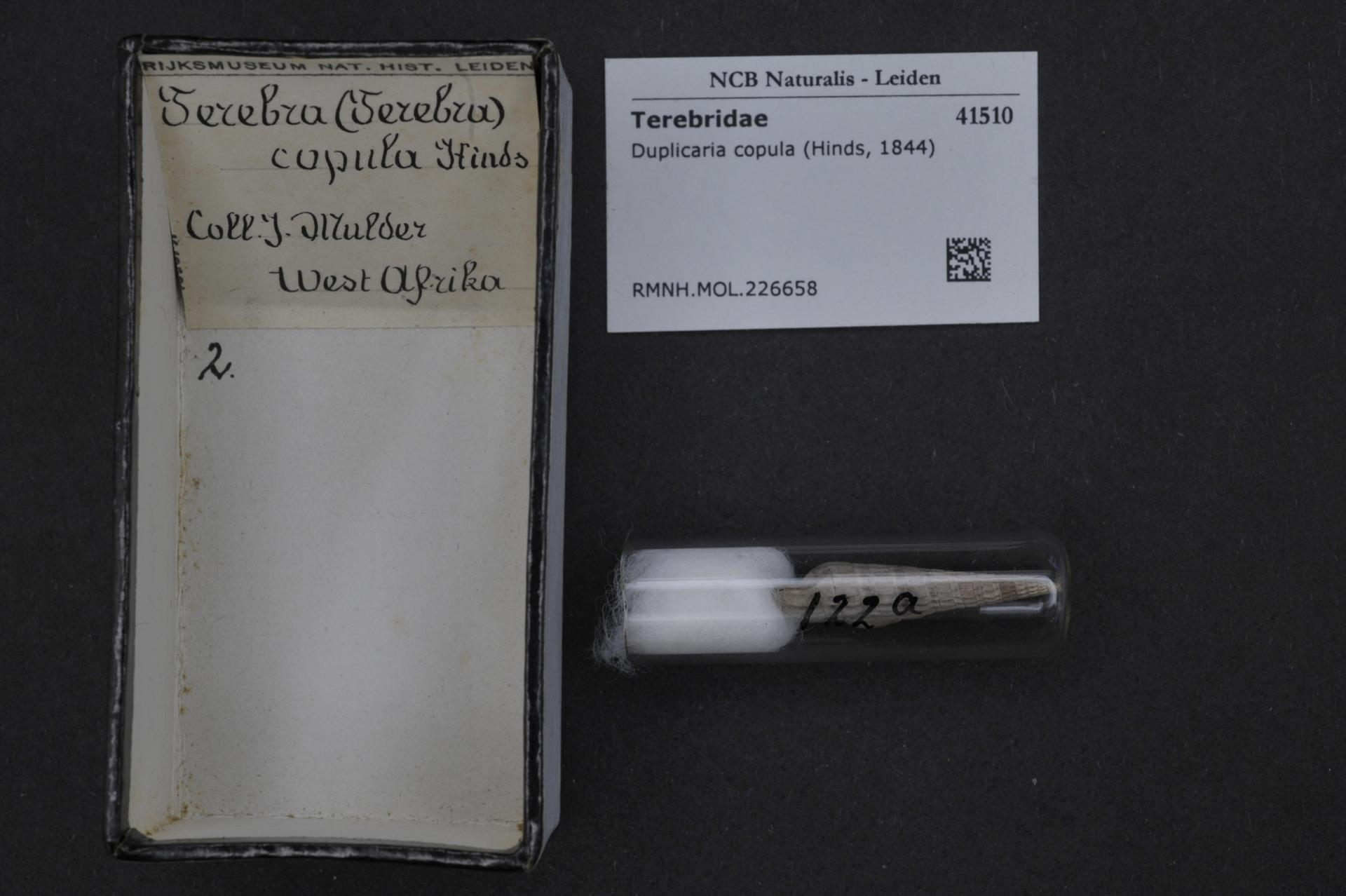
- Duplicaria copula

Scientific classification
- Kingdom: Animalia
- Phylum: Mollusca
- Class: Gastropoda
- Subclass: Caenogastropoda
- Order: Neogastropoda
- Family: Terebridae
- Genus: Duplicaria
- Species: D. copula

Binomial name
- Duplicaria copula (Hinds, 1844)

Synonyms
- Terebra copula Hinds, 1844

= Duplicaria copula =

Species of gastropod

Duplicaria copula is a species of sea snail, a marine gastropod mollusk in the family Terebridae, the auger snails.
