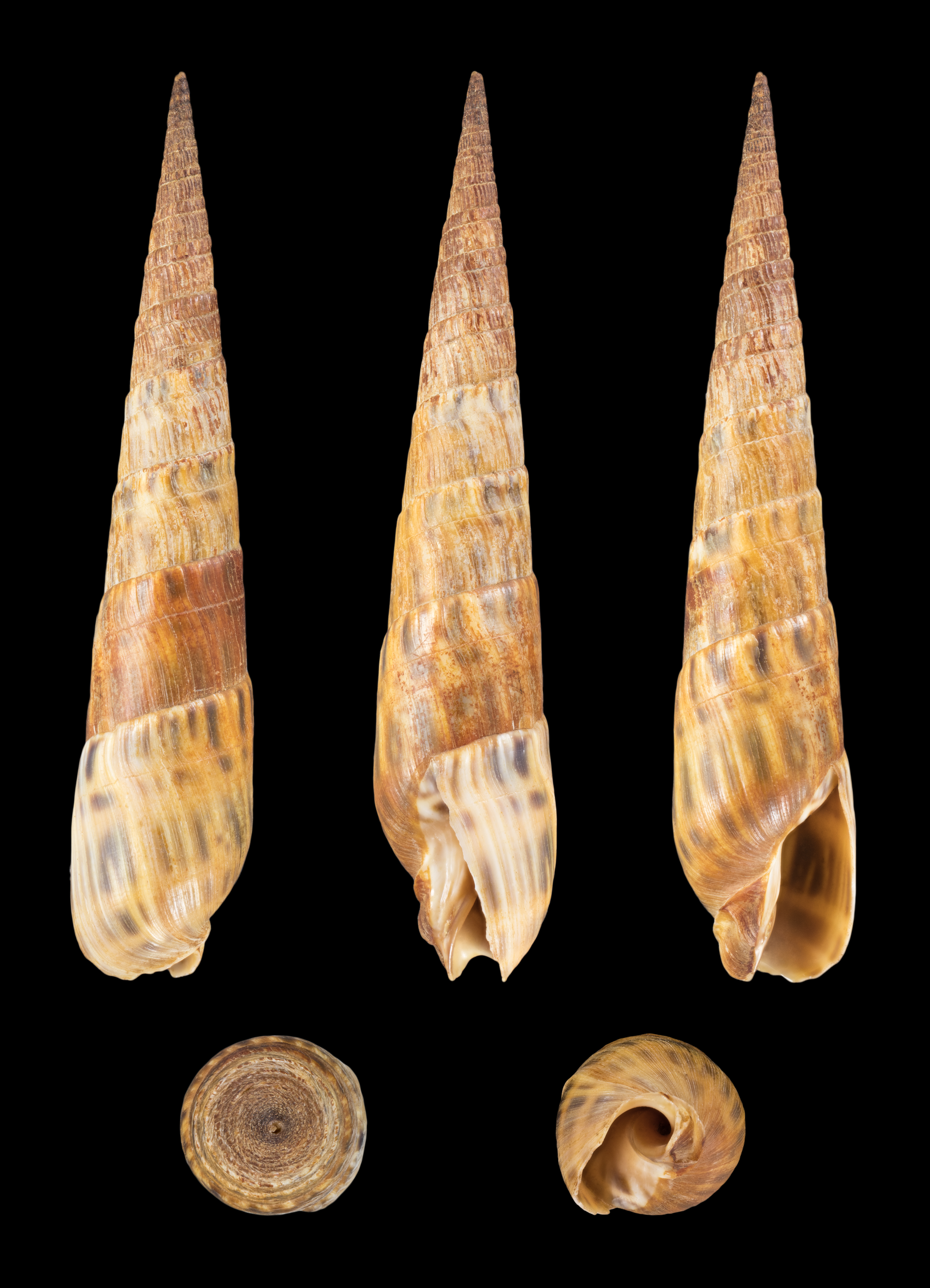
- Five views of a shell of Oxymeris senegalensis

Scientific classification
- Kingdom: Animalia
- Phylum: Mollusca
- Class: Gastropoda
- Subclass: Caenogastropoda
- Order: Neogastropoda
- Family: Terebridae
- Genus: Oxymeris
- Species: O. senegalensis

Binomial name
- Oxymeris senegalensis (Lamarck, 1822)

Synonyms
- Acus senegalensis (Lamarck, 1822); Duplicaria angolensis (Aubry, 1999); Duplicaria sinae Prelle, 2011; Terebra angolensis Aubry, 1999; Terebra cingula Kiener, 1839; Terebra faval Adanson, 1757; Terebra favat d'Orbigny in Webb & Berthelot, 1839; Terebra festiva Deshayes, 1857; Terebra fuscomaculata Sowerby, 1825; Terebra senegalensis Lamarck, 1822; Terebra speciosa Deshayes, 1859; Terebra striatula Lamarck, 1822

= Oxymeris senegalensis =

Species of gastropod

Oxymeris senegalensis, common name : the faval auger, is a species of sea snail, a marine gastropod mollusc in the family Terebridae, the auger snails.

== Description ==
The size of an adult shell varies between 35 mm and 165 mm.

== Distribution ==
This species occurs in the Atlantic Ocean from South Morocco to Angola.
