= Duplicaria fictilis =

Scientific classification
- Kingdom: Animalia
- Phylum: Mollusca
- Class: Gastropoda
- Subclass: Caenogastropoda
- Order: Neogastropoda
- Family: Terebridae
- Genus: Duplicaria
- Species: D. fictilis

Binomial name
- Duplicaria fictilis (Hinds, 1844)

Synonyms
- Pervicacia fictilis (Hinds, 1844); Pervicacia helenae Cotton, 1952; Terebra fictilis Hinds in Sowerby, 1844

Species of gastropod

Duplicaria fictilis is a species of sea snail, a marine gastropod mollusk in the family Terebridae, the auger snails.
