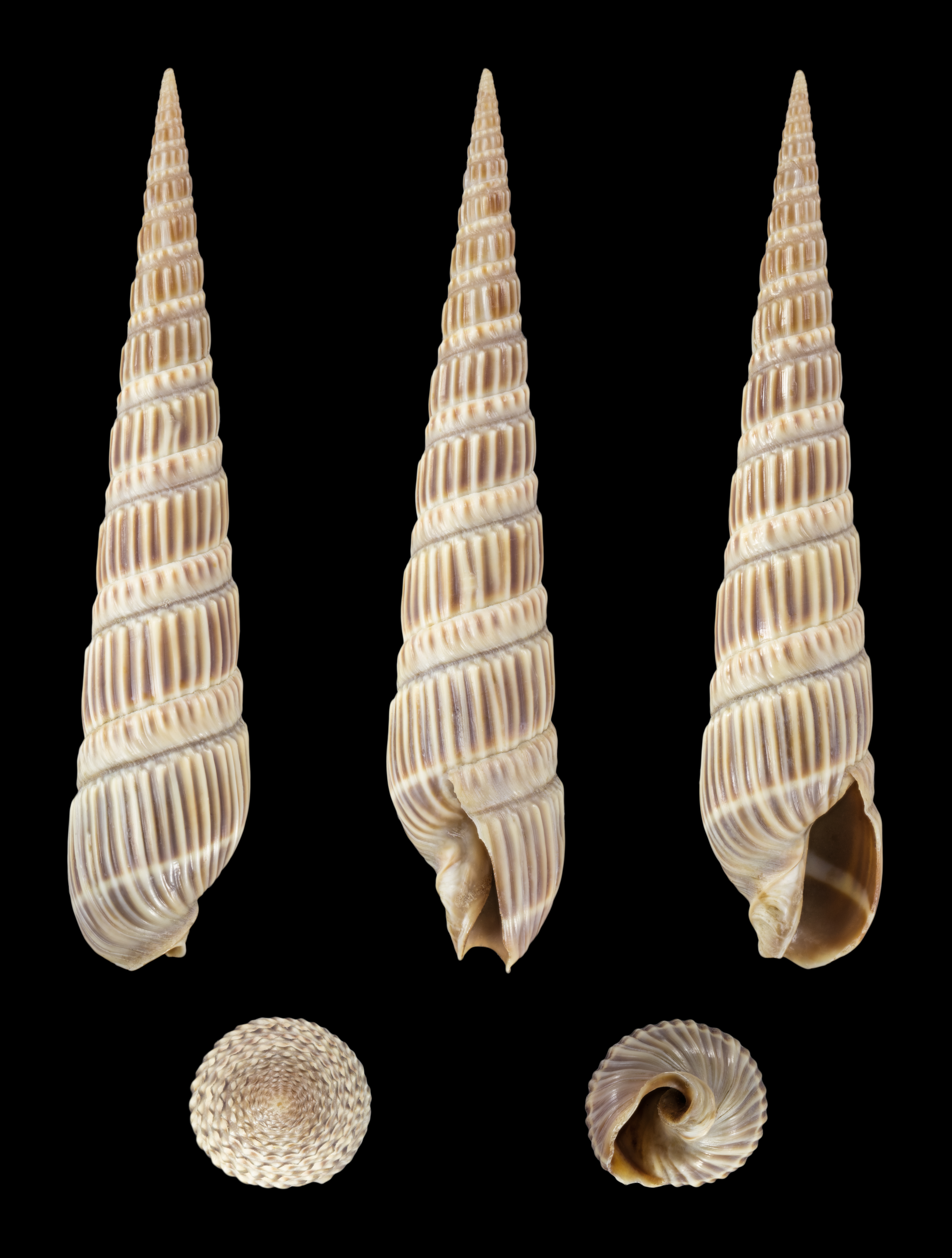
- Five views of a shell of Duplicaria dussumierii

Scientific classification
- Kingdom: Animalia
- Phylum: Mollusca
- Class: Gastropoda
- Subclass: Caenogastropoda
- Order: Neogastropoda
- Family: Terebridae
- Genus: Duplicaria
- Species: D. dussumierii

Binomial name
- Duplicaria dussumierii (Kiener, 1839)

Synonyms
- Duplicaria dussumieri [sic] (misspelling); Terebra dussumieri [sic] (misspelling); Terebra dussumierii Kiener, 1839

= Duplicaria dussumierii =

Species of gastropod

Duplicaria dussumierii, common name Dussumier's auger, is a species of sea snail, a marine gastropod mollusk in the family Terebridae, the auger snails.

== Description ==
The length of the shell varies between 40 mm and 112 mm.

== Distribution ==
This marine species occurs off Indonesia, China, Japan, and Korea.
