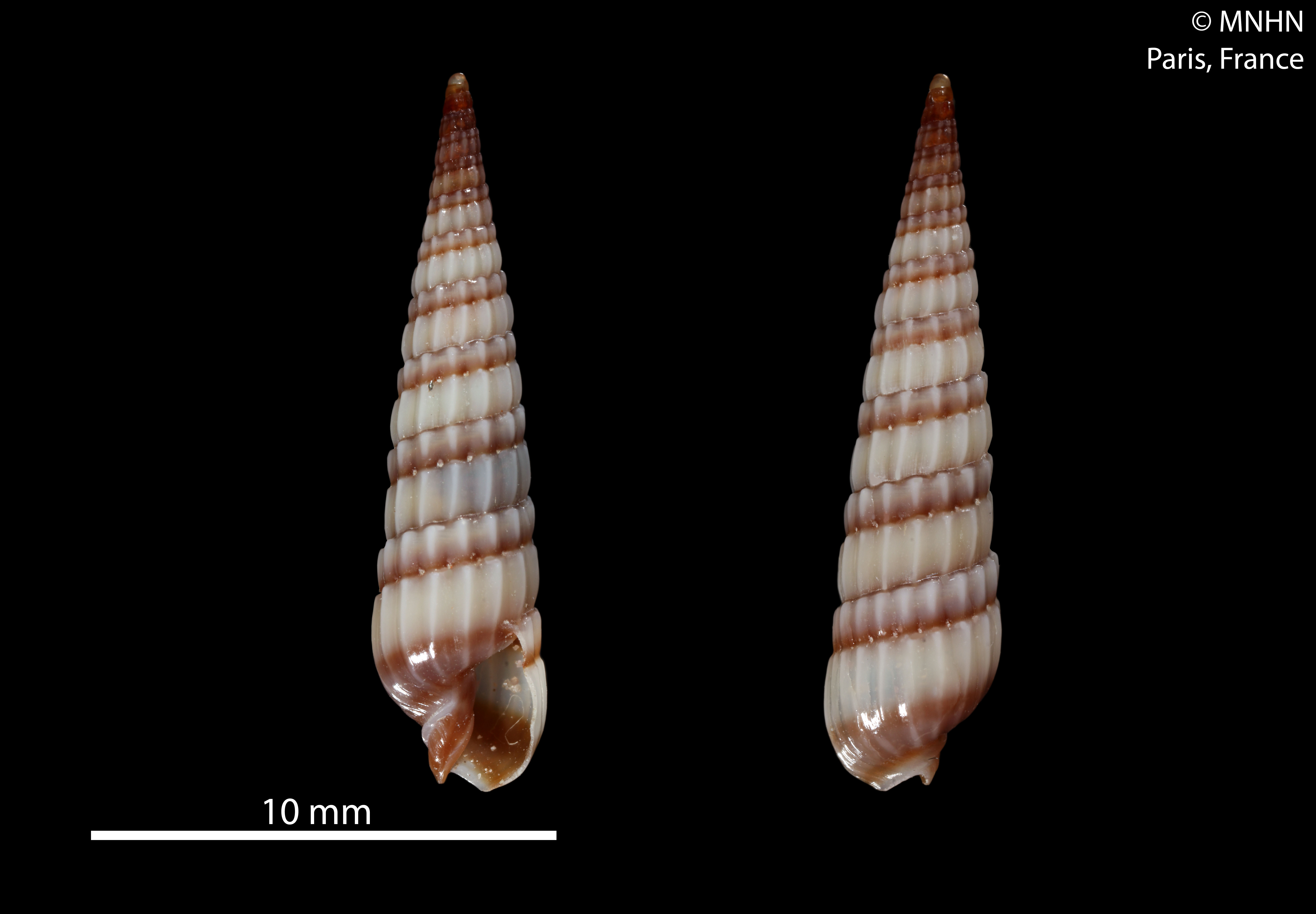
- Shell of Duplicaria crakei (paratype at MNHN, Paris)

Scientific classification
- Kingdom: Animalia
- Phylum: Mollusca
- Class: Gastropoda
- Subclass: Caenogastropoda
- Order: Neogastropoda
- Family: Terebridae
- Genus: Duplicaria
- Species: D. crakei

Binomial name
- Duplicaria crakei Burch, 1965

Synonyms
- Terebra crakei Burch, 1965

= Duplicaria crakei =

Species of gastropod

Duplicaria crakei is a species of sea snail, a marine gastropod mollusk in the family Terebridae, the auger snails.

== Distribution ==
This marine species occurs off Australia.
