= Duplicaria nadinae =

Scientific classification
- Kingdom: Animalia
- Phylum: Mollusca
- Class: Gastropoda
- Subclass: Caenogastropoda
- Order: Neogastropoda
- Family: Terebridae
- Genus: Duplicaria
- Species: D. nadinae

Binomial name
- Duplicaria nadinae (Aubry, 2008)

Synonyms
- Terebra nadinae Aubry, 2008

Species of gastropod

Duplicaria nadinae is a species of sea snail, a marine gastropod mollusc in the family Terebridae, the auger snails.

The status of this species is uncertain.
