= Duplicaria morbida =

Scientific classification
- Kingdom: Animalia
- Phylum: Mollusca
- Class: Gastropoda
- Subclass: Caenogastropoda
- Order: Neogastropoda
- Family: Terebridae
- Genus: Duplicaria
- Species: D. morbida

Binomial name
- Duplicaria morbida (Reeve, 1860)

Synonyms
- Terebra morbida Reeve, 1860

Species of sea snail

Duplicaria morbida is a species of sea snail, a marine gastropod mollusk in the family Terebridae, the auger snails.
