= Bathyterebra =

Scientific classification
- Kingdom: Animalia
- Phylum: Mollusca
- Class: Gastropoda
- Subclass: Caenogastropoda
- Order: Neogastropoda
- Superfamily: Conoidea
- Family: Terebridae
- Genus: Bathyterebra; Fedosov, Malcolm, Terryn, Gorson, Modica, Holford & Puillandre, 2020

Species
- See text

Genus of gastropods

Bathyterebra is a genus of marine snails, gastropod molluscs in the family Terebridae, subfamily Pellifroniinae.

== Species ==
Species within the genus Bathyterebra include:

- Bathyterebra benthalis (Dall, 1889)
- Bathyterebra coriolisi (Aubry, 1999)
- Bathyterebra zhongshaensis Malcolm, Terryn & Fedosov, 2020
