= Duplicaria helenae =

Scientific classification
- Kingdom: Animalia
- Phylum: Mollusca
- Class: Gastropoda
- Subclass: Caenogastropoda
- Order: Neogastropoda
- Family: Terebridae
- Genus: Duplicaria
- Species: D. helenae

Binomial name
- Duplicaria helenae (Hinds, 1844)

Species of gastropod

Duplicaria helenae is a species of sea snail in the family Terebridae.
