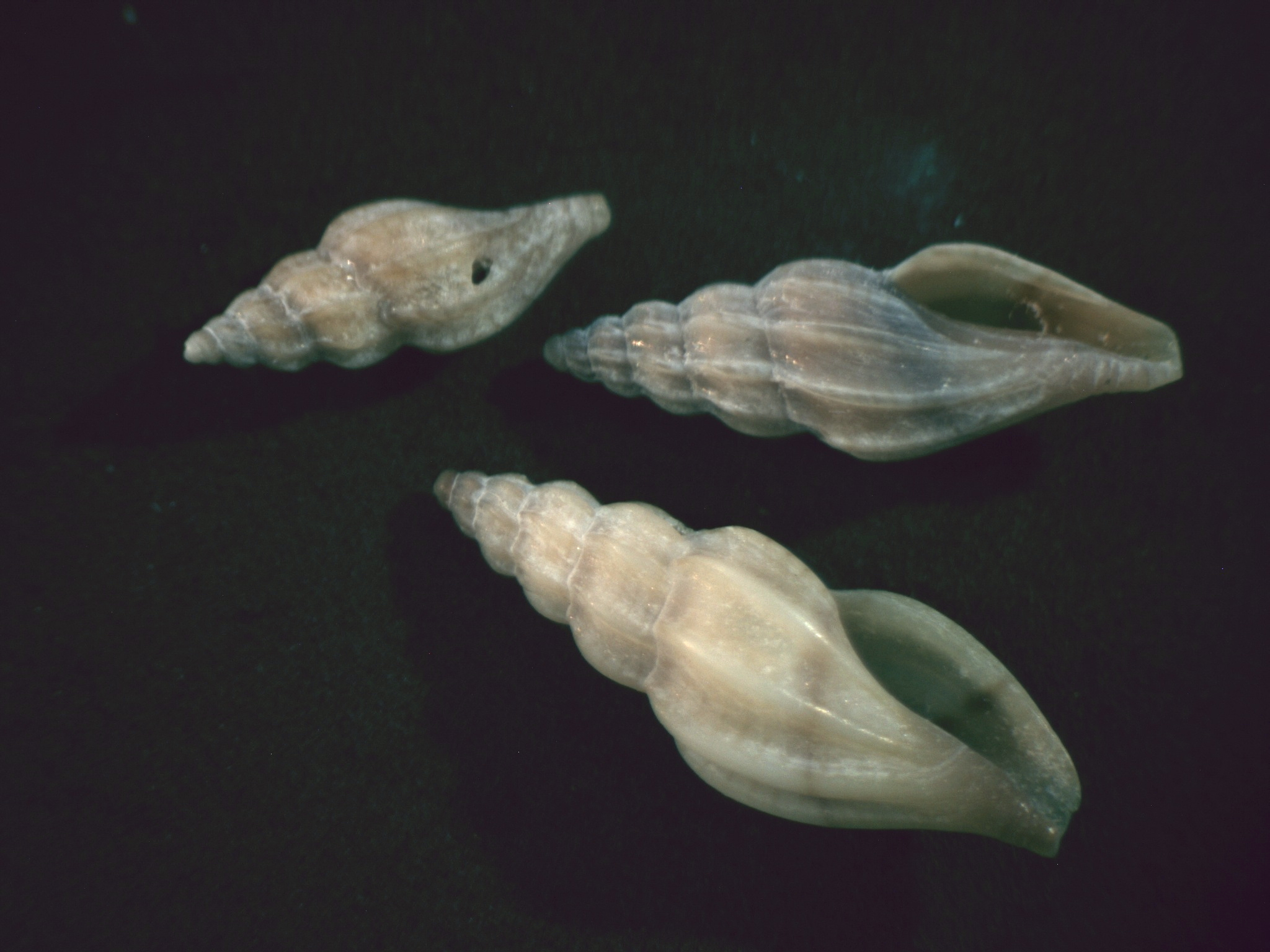
- Shells of Mangelia attenuata

Scientific classification
- Kingdom: Animalia
- Phylum: Mollusca
- Class: Gastropoda
- Subclass: Caenogastropoda
- Order: Neogastropoda
- Superfamily: Conoidea
- Family: Mangeliidae
- Genus: Mangelia
- Species: M. attenuata

Binomial name
- Mangelia attenuata (Montagu, 1803)

Synonyms
- Cythara attenuata (Montagu, 1803); Daphnella attenuata (Montagu, 1803); Mangelia striolata Risso, 1826; Murex aciculatus Lamarck, J.B.P.A. de, 1822; Murex attenuatus Montagu, 1803 (basionym); Pleurotoma villiersii Michaud, A.L.G., 1829; Pleurotoma gracile Philippi, R.A., 1836; Pleurotoma gracilis Scacchi, A., 1836; Pleurotoma payraudeauti Weinkauff, H.C., 1868; Pleurotoma valenciennesii Maravigna, C., 1840; Pleurotoma villiersii Michaud, A.L.G., 1829; Pleurotoma vulpina Bivona-Bernardi, Ant. & And. Bivona-Bernardi, 1838; Raphitoma payraudeauti Weinkauff, 1868

= Mangelia attenuata =

Species of gastropod

Mangelia attenuata is a species of sea snail, a marine gastropod mollusk in the family Mangeliidae.

== Description ==
The shell size varies between 5 mm and 13 mm.

The shell has nine whorls. Each whorl contains nine ribs, narrow, flexuous, with wider interspaces, spirally slightly and finely striate. The narrow aperture is long. The siphonal canal is short and broad. Its color is pale tawny, the upper part and middle of the body whorl often banded, or the lower half of the body whorl darker colored, sometimes there are several narrow revolving chestnut lines.

== Distribution ==
This species occurs in the Northeast Atlantic Ocean, in European waters (but not in the southern part of the North Sea) and in the Mediterranean Sea.
