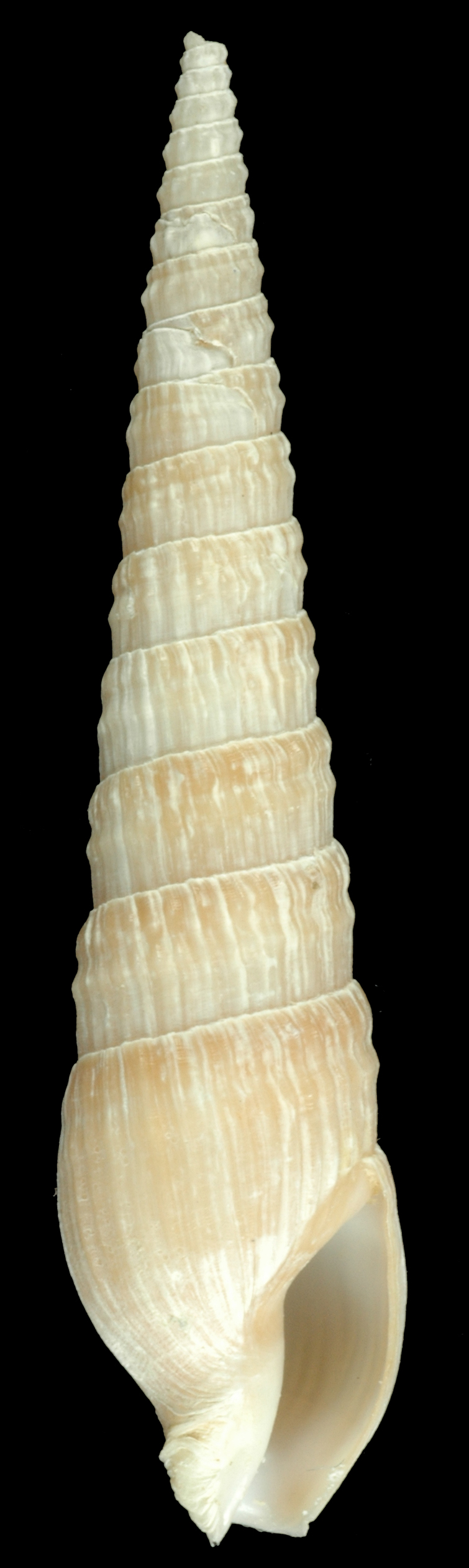

Scientific classification
- Kingdom: Animalia
- Phylum: Mollusca
- Class: Gastropoda
- Subclass: Caenogastropoda
- Order: Neogastropoda
- Superfamily: Conoidea
- Family: Terebridae
- Genus: Bathyterebra
- Species: B. benthalis

Binomial name
- Bathyterebra benthalis (Dall, 1889)

Synonyms
- Duplicaria benthalis (Dall, 1889); Terebra benthalis Dall, 1889

= Bathyterebra benthalis =

Species of gastropod

Bathyterebra benthalis is a species of sea snail, a marine gastropod mollusk in the family Terebridae, the auger snails.

== Distribution ==
This marine species occurs off Cuba.
