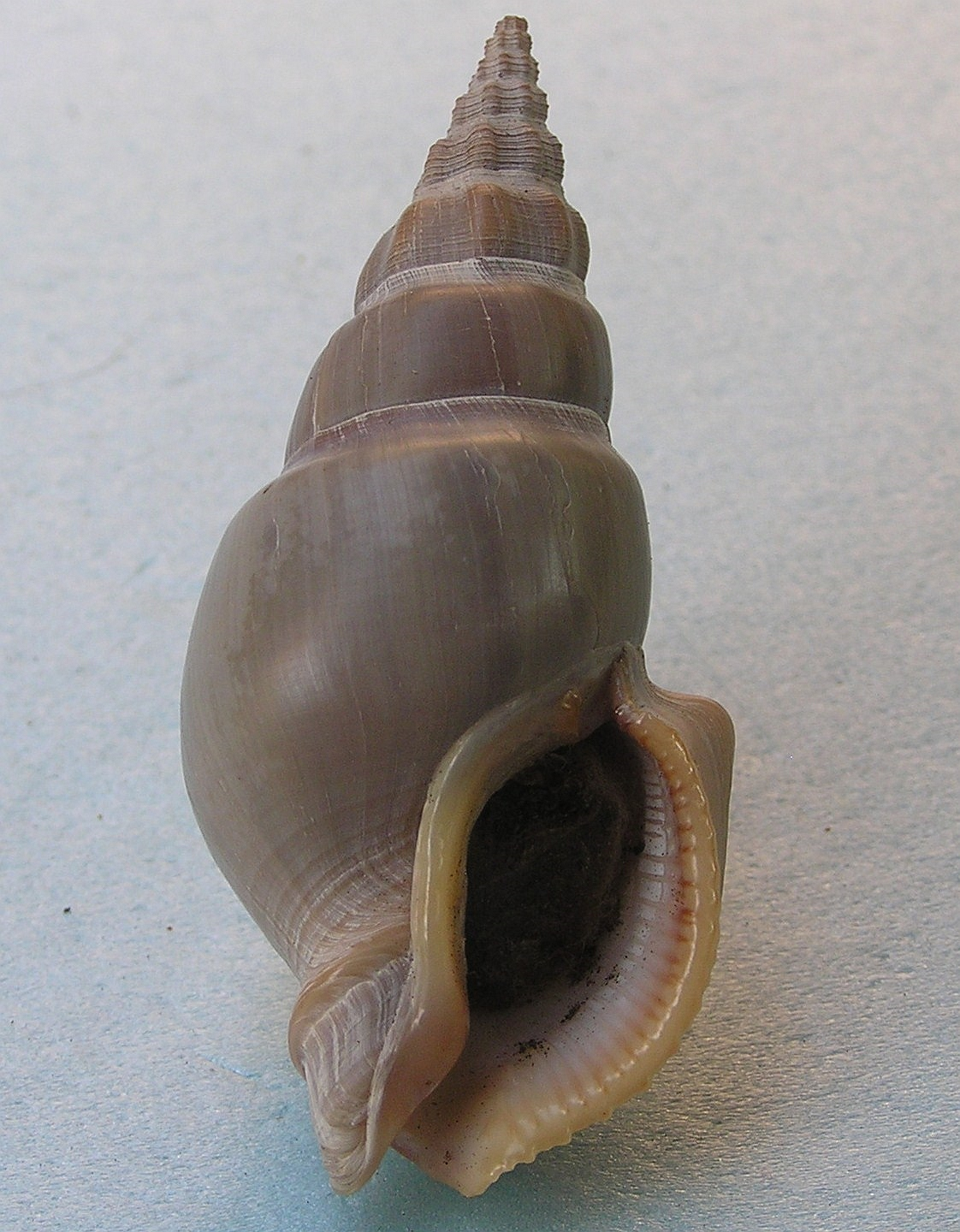
- Northia pristis

Scientific classification
- Kingdom: Animalia
- Phylum: Mollusca
- Class: Gastropoda
- Subclass: Caenogastropoda
- Order: Neogastropoda
- Superfamily: Buccinoidea
- Family: Nassariidae
- Genus: Northia; Gray, 1847

Type species
- Buccinum pristis Deshayes, 1844

= Northia (gastropod) =

Genus of gastropods

Northia is a genus of large sea snails, marine gastropod mollusks in the subfamily Photinae of the family Nassariidae.

== Description ==
The shell is elongated, turreted and polished. The spire is elevated, acuminated with whorls depressed and sloping at their upper part. The aperture is shorter than the spire. The outer lip shows the margin serrated.

== Species ==
According to the World Register of Marine Species (WoRMS), the following species with valid names are included within the genus Northia :

- Northia northiae (Griffith & Pidgeon (ex. Gray MS), 1834)
- Northia pristis (Deshayes, G.P. in Lamarck, J.B.P.A. de, 1844)

Taxon inquirendum

- Northia angulosa Jousseaume, 1898

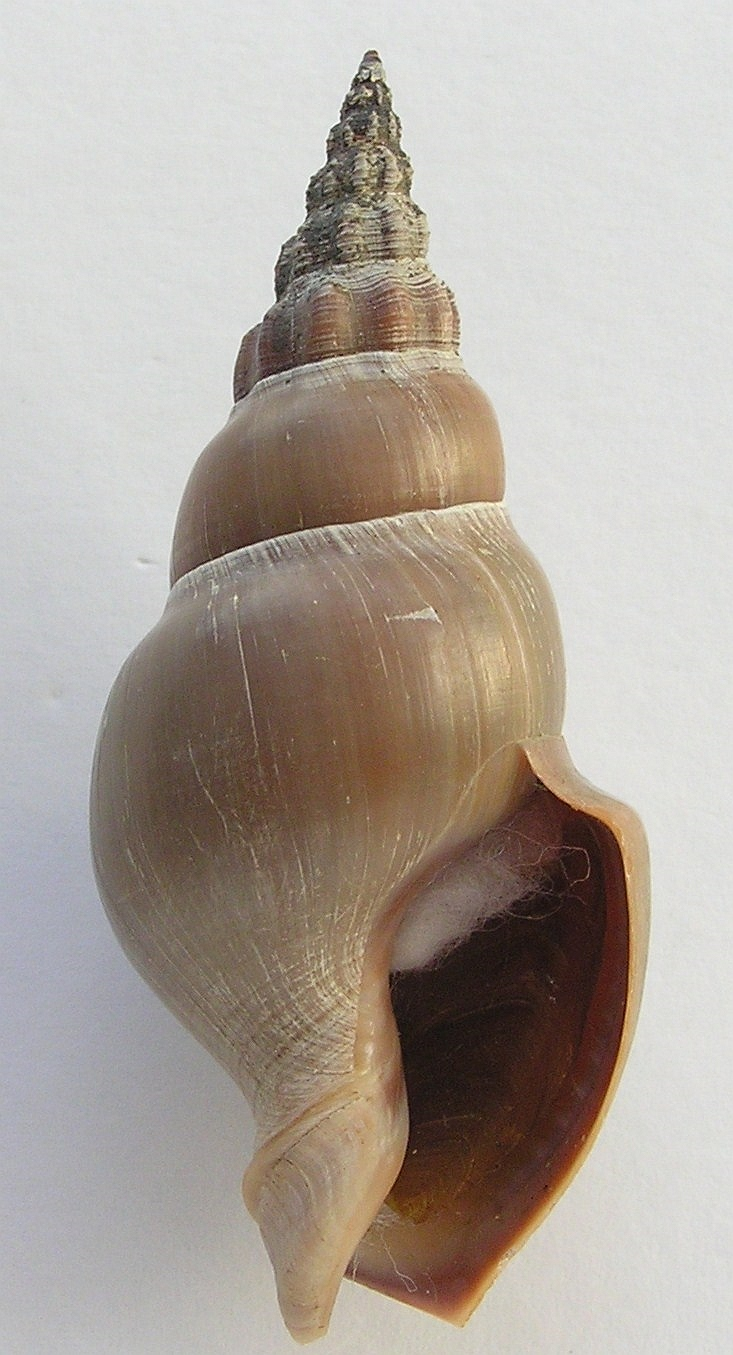
Northia northiae
