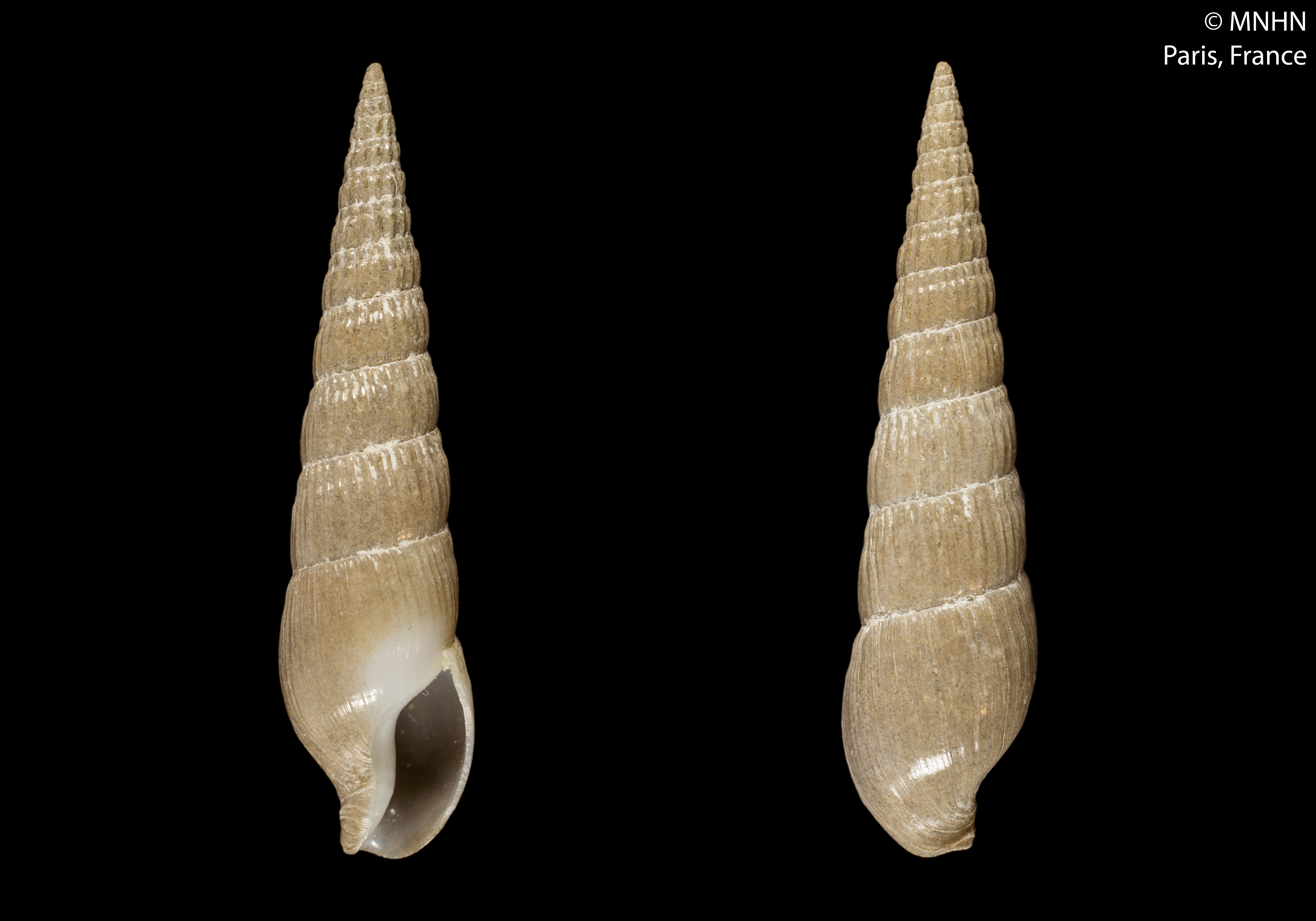
- Shell of Bathyterebra coriolisi (holotype at MNHN, Paris)

Scientific classification
- Kingdom: Animalia
- Phylum: Mollusca
- Class: Gastropoda
- Subclass: Caenogastropoda
- Order: Neogastropoda
- Superfamily: Conoidea
- Family: Terebridae
- Genus: Bathyterebra
- Species: B. coriolisi

Binomial name
- Bathyterebra coriolisi (Aubry, 1999)

Synonyms
- Duplicaria coriolisi (Aubry, 1999); Terebra coriolisi Aubry, 1999 (original combination)

= Bathyterebra coriolisi =

Species of gastropod

Bathyterebra coriolisi is a species of sea snail, a marine gastropod mollusk in the family Terebridae, subfamily Pellifroniinae.

== Distribution ==
This marine species occurs in the Coral Sea .
