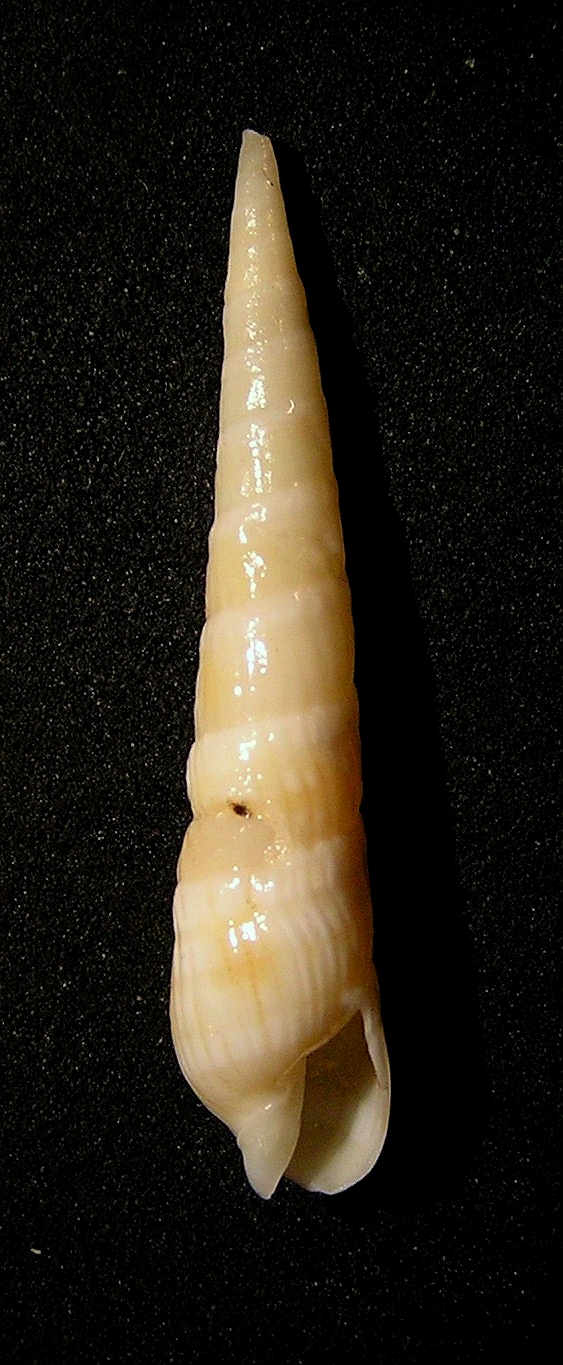
- Apertural view of a shell of Hastula raphanula

Scientific classification
- Kingdom: Animalia
- Phylum: Mollusca
- Class: Gastropoda
- Subclass: Caenogastropoda
- Order: Neogastropoda
- Family: Terebridae
- Genus: Hastula
- Species: H. raphanula

Binomial name
- Hastula raphanula (Lamarck, 1822)

Synonyms
- Duplicaria deynzerorum Sprague, 2004; Duplicaria raphanula (Lamarck, 1822); Subula raphanula (Lamarck, 1822); Terebra raphanula Lamarck, 1822 (original combination)

= Hastula raphanula =

Species of sea snail

Hastula raphanula, common name (little) radish auger, is a species of sea snail, a marine gastropod mollusk in the family Terebridae, the auger snails.

== Description ==
The length of the shell varies between 30 mm and 80 mm.

== Distribution ==
This marine shell occurs off South Africa, Chagos, the Mascarene Basin, the Philippines, New Guinea, and the Fiji Islands.
