= Gérard Paul Deshayes =

French geologist and conchologist

- Born: 13 May 1795; Nancy, France
- Died: 9 June 1875 (aged 80); Boran-sur-Oise, Oise, France
- Education: University of Strasbourg
- Known for: Contributions to invertebrate paleontology
- Awards: Wollaston Medal (1870)
- Scientific career
- Fields: Geologist and conchologist
- Workplaces: Muséum National d'Histoire Naturelle

Gérard Paul Deshayes (French pronunciation: [ʒeʁaʁ pɔl deɛ]; 13 May 1795 – 9 June 1875) was a French geologist and conchologist.

== Career ==
He was born in Nancy, his father at that time being professor of experimental physics in the École Centrale of the département Meurthe

He studied medicine in Strasbourg, and afterwards took the degree of bachelier ès lettres in Paris in 1821; but he abandoned the medical profession in order to devote himself to natural history. For some time he gave private lessons on geology, and subsequently became professor of natural history in the Muséum National d'Histoire Naturelle.

He was distinguished for his researches on the fossil mollusca of the Paris Basin and of other areas Cenozoic cover. His studies on the relations of the fossil to the recent species led him as early as 1829 to conclusions somewhat similar to those arrived at by Lyell, to whom Deshayes rendered much assistance in connection with the classification of the, then, Tertiary system into Eocene, Miocene and Pliocene.

With André Étienne d'Audebert de Férussac, he co-authored an important study on terrestrial and river mollusks titled Histoire naturelle générale et particulière des Mollusques terrestres et fluviatiles (1820-1851). In 1839 he began the publication of his Traité élémentaire de conchyliologie, the last part of which was not issued until 1857. In the same year (1839) he went to Algeria for the French government, and spent three years in explorations in that country. His principal work, which resulted from the collections he made, Mollusques de l'Algérie, was issued (incomplete) in 1848.

He was a member of the Société Géologique de France, of which he served as chairman several times. In 1870 the Wollaston medal of the Geological Society of London was awarded to him. He died in Boran-sur-Oise.

== Works ==
His publications included:

- Description des coquilles fossiles des environs de Paris (2 vols. and atlas, 1824-1837)
- Description de coquilles caractéristiques des terrains.– Paris: F. G. Levrault, 1831.– 264 pp., 14 pls.
- Mollusques. In: Saint-Hilaire G., Deshayes G., Saint-Vincent B., Saint-Vincent B. Expédition scientifique de Morée. Section des sciences physiques. Tome III. Première partie. Zoologie. Première section.– Animaux vertébrés, mollusques et polypies.– Paris-Strasbourg: F. G. Levrault., 1832.– p. 81-203, pls. 18-26.
- Traité élémentaire de conchyliologie avec les applications de cette science à la geologie.
  - (1839-1853). Premiere Partie - Introduction. (part 1 - Introduction)
  - (1843-1850). Seconde Partie - Conchiféres dimyaires (Part 2)
  - (1839-1853). Explication des planches. (Explanation of plates)
  - (1839-1857). Atlas. (Atlas of plates)
- Description des animaux sans vertèbres découverts dans le bassin de Paris (3 vols. and atlas, 1856-1866)
- Catalogue des mollusques de l'île de la Reunion (1863).

== Taxa named by Gérard Paul Deshayes ==
- Bursa lamarckii - Lamarck's frog shell
