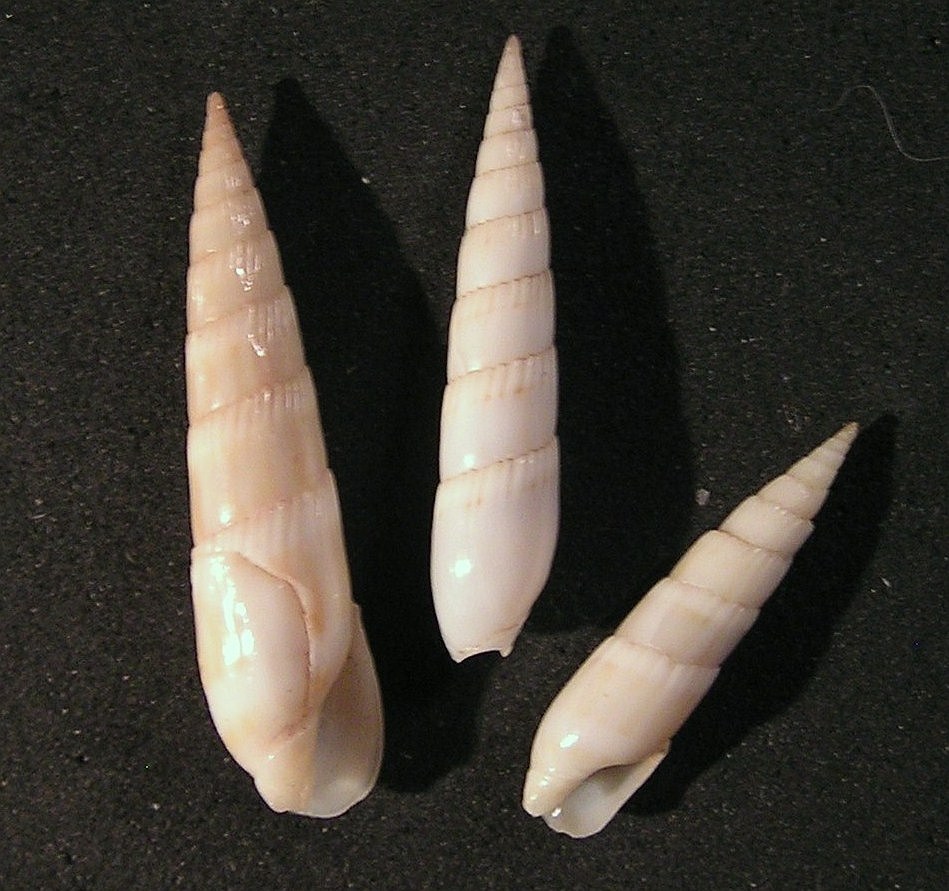
- Several views of the shell of Hastula apicitincta

Scientific classification
- Kingdom: Animalia
- Phylum: Mollusca
- Class: Gastropoda
- Subclass: Caenogastropoda
- Order: Neogastropoda
- Family: Terebridae
- Genus: Impages; E.A. Smith, 1873

= Impages =

Genus of gastropods

Impages is a genus of sea snails, marine gastropod mollusks in the family Terebridae, the auger snails.

This genus has become a synonym of Hastula H. Adams & A. Adams, 1853

== Species ==
Species brought into synonymy

- Impages aciculina (Lamarck, 1822): synonym of Hastula aciculina (Lamarck, 1822)
- Impages anomala (Gray, 1834): synonym of Hastula anomala (Gray, 1834)
- Impages anosyana Bozzetti, 2016: synonym of Hastula anosyana (Bozzetti, 2016) (original combination)
- Impages apicitincta (G.B. Sowerby III, 1900): synonym of Hastula apicitincta (G. B. Sowerby III, 1900)
- Impages bacillus (Deshayes, 1859): synonym of Hastula bacillus (Deshayes, 1859)
- Impages cernohorskyi (Burch, 1965): synonym of Hastula cernohorskyi R. D. Burch, 1965
- Impages cinerea (Born, 1778): synonym of Hastula cinerea (Born, 1778)
- Impages continua (Deshayes, 1859): synonym of Hastula continua (Deshayes, 1859)
- Impages daniae (Aubry, 2008): synonym of Hastula daniae (Aubry, 2008)
- Impages escondida Terryn, 2006: synonym of Hastula escondida (Terryn, 2006) (original combination)
- Impages hectica (Linnaeus, 1758): synonym of Hastula hectica (Linnaeus, 1758)
- Impages inconstans (Hinds, 1844): synonym of Hastula inconstans (Hinds, 1844)
- Impages marqueti (Aubry, 1994): synonym of Partecosta marqueti (Aubry, 1994), synonym of Hastula marqueti (Aubry, 1994)
- Impages maryleeae Burch, 1965: synonym of Hastula maryleeae R. D. Burch, 1965
- Impages nana (Deshayes, 1859): synonym of Hastula nana (Deshayes, 1859)
- Impages nassoides (Hinds, 1844): synonym of Partecosta nassoides (Hinds, 1844)
- Impages salleana (Deshayes, 1859): synonym of Hastula salleana (Deshayes, 1859)
- Impages stylata (Hinds, 1844): synonym of Hastula stylata (Hinds, 1844)
