= Hastula pilsbryi =

Scientific classification
- Kingdom: Animalia
- Phylum: Mollusca
- Class: Gastropoda
- Subclass: Caenogastropoda
- Order: Neogastropoda
- Family: Terebridae
- Genus: Hastula
- Species: H. pilsbryi

Binomial name
- Hastula pilsbryi (Aubry, 1999)

Synonyms
- Duplicaria pilsbryi (Aubry, 1999); Terebra pilsbryi Aubry, 1999 (original combination)

Species of sea snail

Hastula pilsbryi is a species of sea snail, a marine gastropod mollusc in the family Terebridae, the auger snails.
