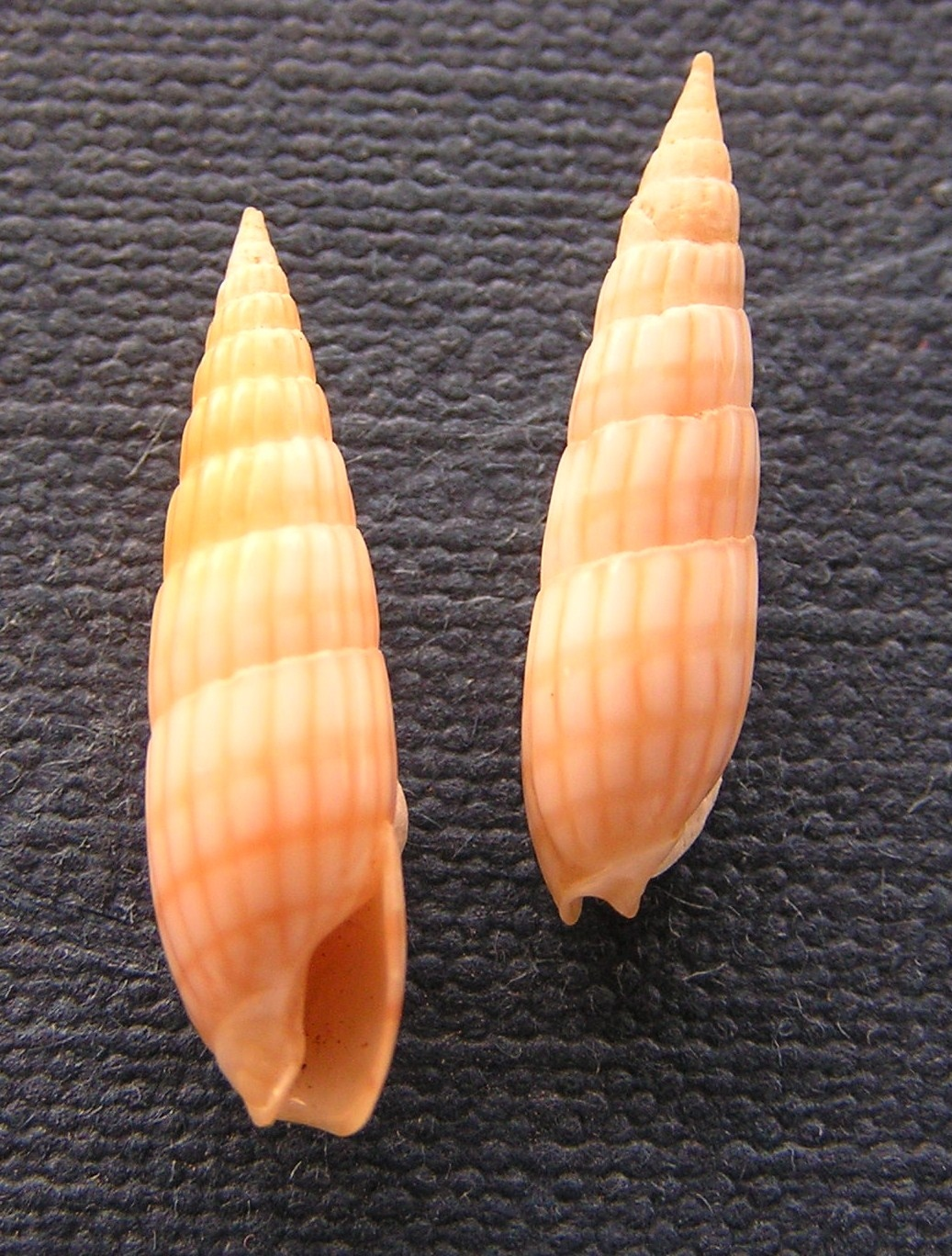
- Two shells of Hastula solida

Scientific classification
- Kingdom: Animalia
- Phylum: Mollusca
- Class: Gastropoda
- Subclass: Caenogastropoda
- Order: Neogastropoda
- Family: Terebridae
- Genus: Hastula
- Species: H. solida

Binomial name
- Hastula solida (Deshayes, 1855)

Synonyms
- Buccinum aciculatum Gmelin, 1791; Terebra clarkei M. Smith, 1912; Terebra solida Deshayes, 1857 (original combination)

= Hastula solida =

Species of gastropod

Hastula solida, common name the solid auger, is a species of sea snail, a marine gastropod mollusc in the family Terebridae, the auger snails.

== Description ==
The length of the shell varies between 23 mm and 35 mm.

== Distribution ==
This marine species occurs in the tropical Indo-Pacific off Aldabra, the Mascarene Basin, New Guinea, and Fiji.
