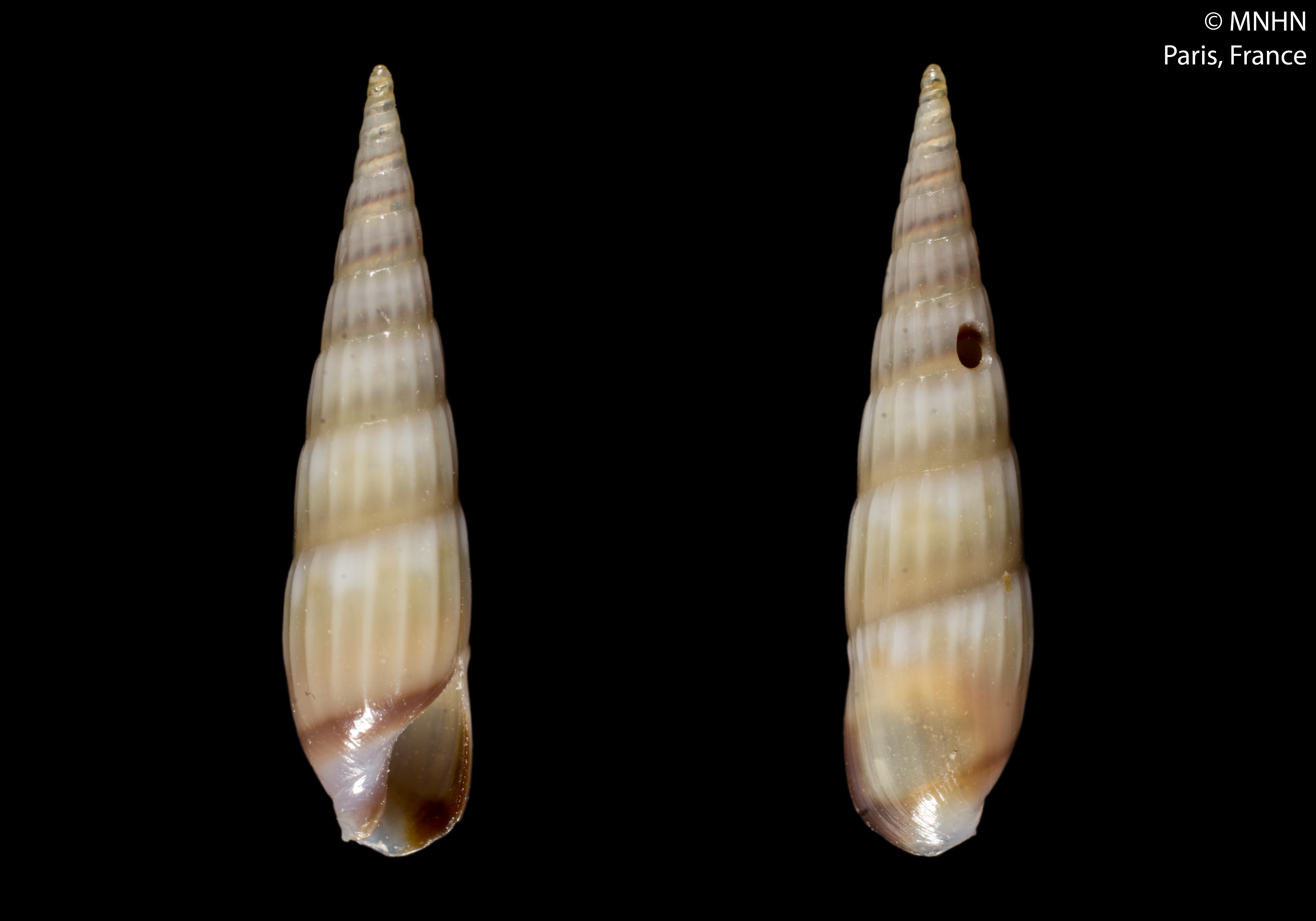
- Shell of Hastula tenuicolorata (holotype at MNHN, Paris)

Scientific classification
- Kingdom: Animalia
- Phylum: Mollusca
- Class: Gastropoda
- Subclass: Caenogastropoda
- Order: Neogastropoda
- Family: Terebridae
- Genus: Hastula
- Species: H. tenuicolorata

Binomial name
- Hastula tenuicolorata Bozzetti, 2008

= Hastula tenuicolorata =

Species of gastropod

Hastula tenuicolorata is a species of sea snail, a marine gastropod mollusc in the family Terebridae, the auger snails.

== Description ==
The length of the shell varies between 8 mm and 13 mm.

== Distribution ==
This marine species occurs off Madagascar
