= Hastula filmerae =

Scientific classification
- Kingdom: Animalia
- Phylum: Mollusca
- Class: Gastropoda
- Subclass: Caenogastropoda
- Order: Neogastropoda
- Family: Terebridae
- Genus: Hastula
- Species: H. filmerae

Binomial name
- Hastula filmerae (G.B. Sowerby III, 1906)

Synonyms
- Terebra filmerae G.B. Sowerby III, 1906

Species of gastropod

Hastula filmerae is a species of sea snail, a marine gastropod mollusc in the family Terebridae, the auger snails.
