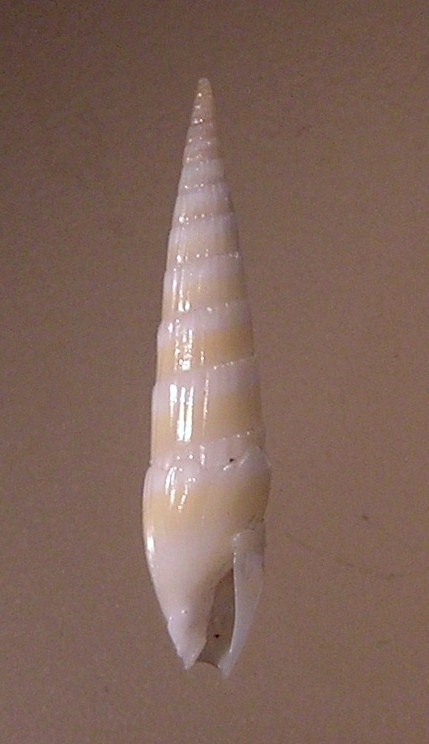

Scientific classification
- Kingdom: Animalia
- Phylum: Mollusca
- Class: Gastropoda
- Subclass: Caenogastropoda
- Order: Neogastropoda
- Family: Terebridae
- Genus: Hastula
- Species: H. alboflava

Binomial name
- Hastula alboflava Bratcher, 1988

= Hastula alboflava =

Species of gastropod

Hastula alboflava is a species of sea snail, a marine gastropod mollusc in the family Terebridae, the auger snails.

== Distribution ==
This marine species occurs off the Philippines.
