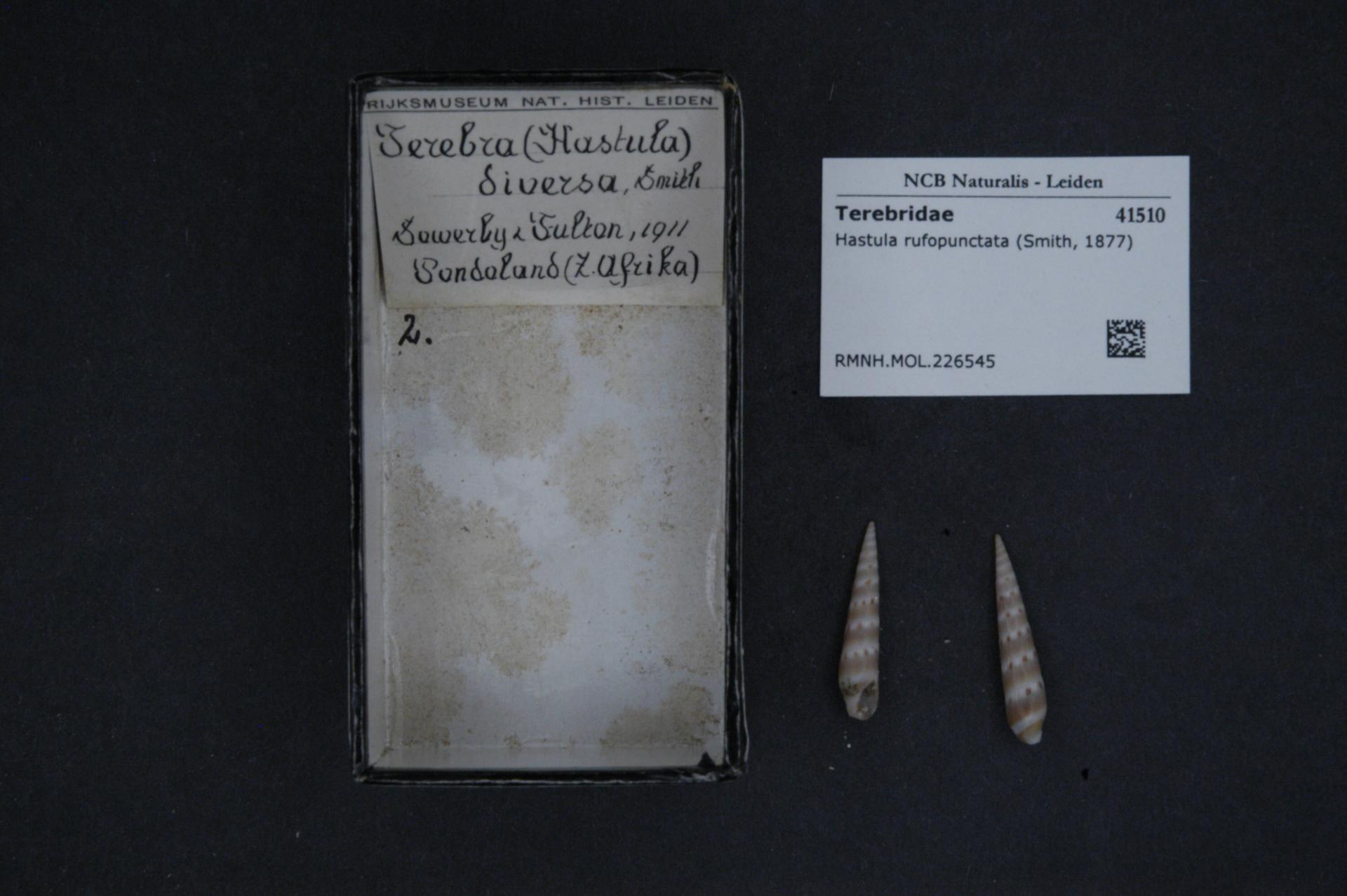

Scientific classification
- Kingdom: Animalia
- Phylum: Mollusca
- Class: Gastropoda
- Subclass: Caenogastropoda
- Order: Neogastropoda
- Family: Terebridae
- Genus: Hastula
- Species: H. rufopunctata

Binomial name
- Hastula rufopunctata (E.A. Smith, 1877)

Synonyms
- Hastula diversa (E.A. Smith, 1901); Terebra diversa E.A. Smith, 1901; Terebra rufopunctata E.A. Smith, 1877

= Hastula rufopunctata =

Species of gastropod

Hastula rufopunctata is a species of sea snail, a marine gastropod mollusc in the family Terebridae, the auger snails.
