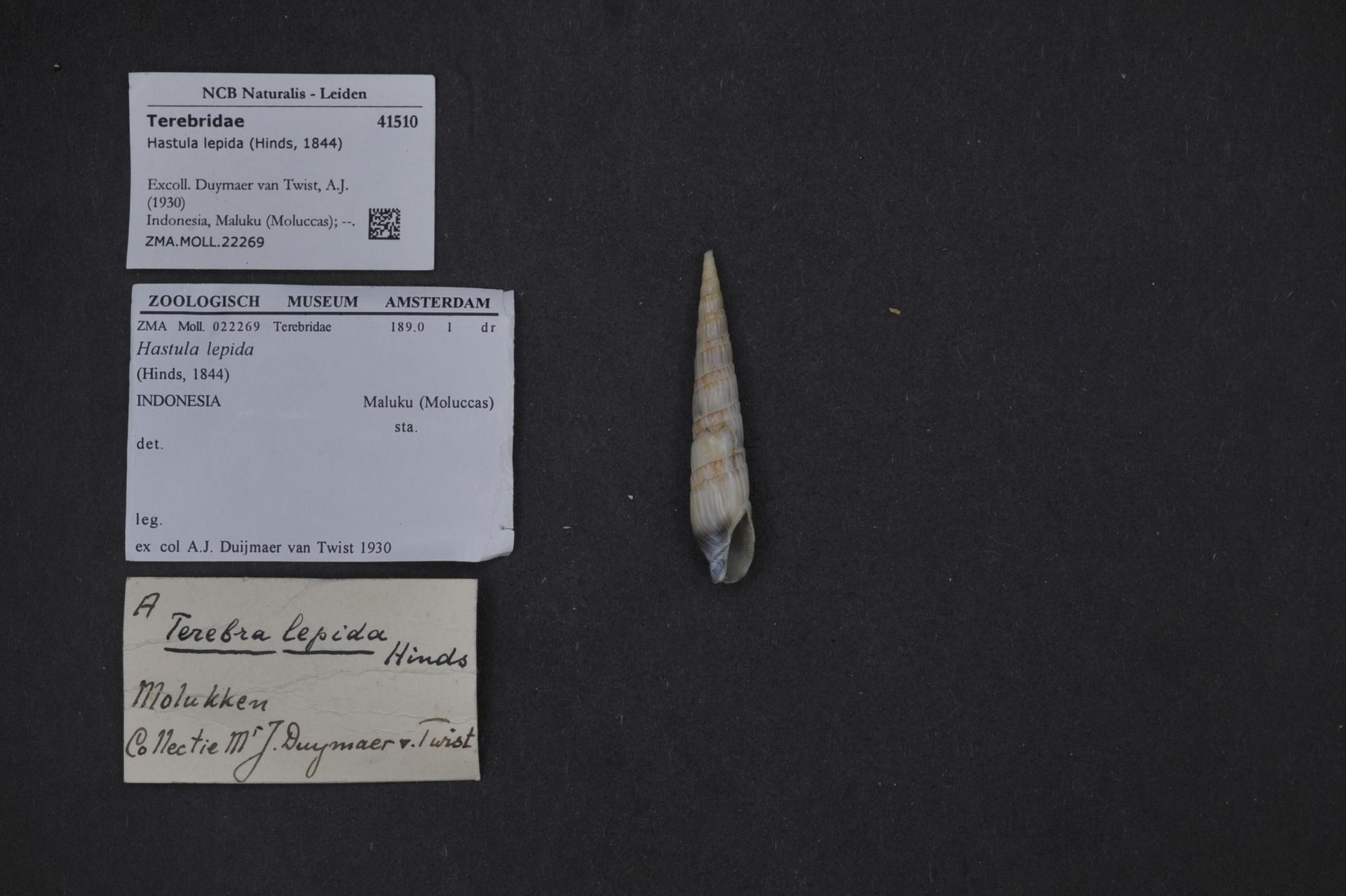

Scientific classification
- Kingdom: Animalia
- Phylum: Mollusca
- Class: Gastropoda
- Subclass: Caenogastropoda
- Order: Neogastropoda
- Family: Terebridae
- Genus: Hastula
- Species: H. lepida

Binomial name
- Hastula lepida (Hinds, 1844)

Synonyms
- Terebra lepida Hinds, 1844

= Hastula lepida =

Species of gastropod

Hastula lepida is a species of sea snail, a marine gastropod mollusc in the family Terebridae, the auger snails.
