= Hastula casta =

Scientific classification
- Kingdom: Animalia
- Phylum: Mollusca
- Class: Gastropoda
- Subclass: Caenogastropoda
- Order: Neogastropoda
- Family: Terebridae
- Genus: Hastula
- Species: H. casta

Binomial name
- Hastula casta (Hinds, 1844)

Synonyms
- Terebra casta Hinds, 1844 (original combination)

Species of gastropod

Hastula casta is a species of sea snail, a marine gastropod mollusk in the family Terebridae, the auger snails.
