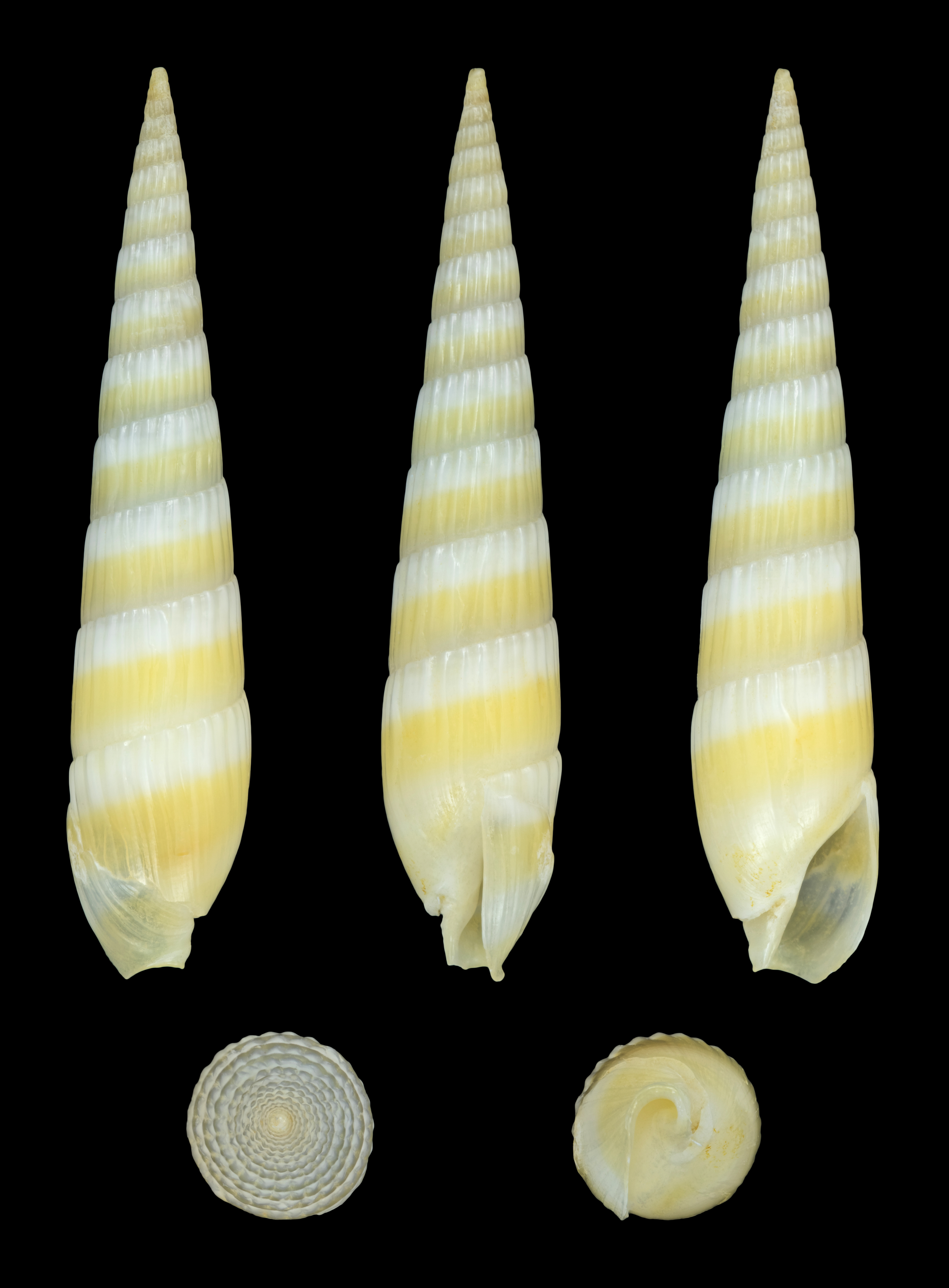
- Shell of Hastula albula

Scientific classification
- Kingdom: Animalia
- Phylum: Mollusca
- Class: Gastropoda
- Subclass: Caenogastropoda
- Order: Neogastropoda
- Family: Terebridae
- Genus: Hastula
- Species: H. albula

Binomial name
- Hastula albula (Menke, 1843)

Synonyms
- Hastula albula albula (Menke, 1843); Hastula albula natalensis (E. A. Smith, 1903); Terebra albula Menke, 1843; Terebra bipartita Deshayes, 1859; Terebra casta var. natalensis E.A. Smith, 1903; Terebra incolor Deshayes, 1859; Terebra mediapacifica melior Pilsbry, 1921; Terebra medipacifica Pilsbry, 1921; Terebra mera Hinds, 1844

= Hastula albula =

Species of gastropod

Hastula albula, the white-banded auger, is a species of sea snail in the family Terebridae.

== Description ==
The size of an adult shell varies between 14 mm and 70 mm.

== Distribution ==
This marine species occurs in the Red Sea, in the Indian Ocean off Aldabra and the Mascarene Basin; off Papua New Guinea and in the Pacific Ocean along Mexico.
