= Hastula exacuminata =

Scientific classification
- Kingdom: Animalia
- Phylum: Mollusca
- Class: Gastropoda
- Subclass: Caenogastropoda
- Order: Neogastropoda
- Family: Terebridae
- Genus: Hastula
- Species: H. exacuminata

Binomial name
- Hastula exacuminata Sacco, 1891

Species of gastropod

Hastula exacuminata is a species of sea snail.

== Description ==
The Hastula exacuminata is a marine gastropod mollusc in the family Terebridae, the auger snails.
