= Hastula venus =

Scientific classification
- Kingdom: Animalia
- Phylum: Mollusca
- Class: Gastropoda
- Subclass: Caenogastropoda
- Order: Neogastropoda
- Family: Terebridae
- Genus: Hastula
- Species: H. venus

Binomial name
- Hastula venus Aubry, 2008

Species of sea snail

Hastula venus is a species of sea snail, a marine gastropod mollusc in the family Terebridae, the auger snails.
