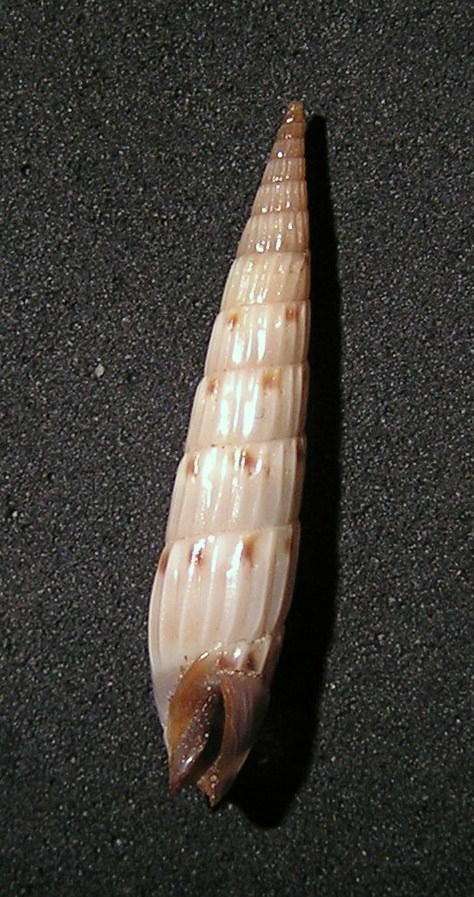
- Apertural view of a shell of Hastula matheroniana

Scientific classification
- Kingdom: Animalia
- Phylum: Mollusca
- Class: Gastropoda
- Subclass: Caenogastropoda
- Order: Neogastropoda
- Family: Terebridae
- Genus: Hastula
- Species: H. matheroniana

Binomial name
- Hastula matheroniana (Deshayes, 1859)

Synonyms
- Hastula lauta Pease, 1869; Terebra lauta Pease, 1869; Terebra matheroniana Deshayes, 1859; Terebra modesta Deshayes, 1859; Terebra strigilata summatrana Thiele, 1925

= Hastula matheroniana =

Species of gastropod

Hastula matheroniana is a species of sea snail, a marine gastropod mollusc in the family Terebridae, the auger snails.

== Description ==
The length of the shell varies between 20 mm and 44 mm.

== Distribution ==
This marine species occurs in the tropical Indo-Pacific.
