= Hastula knockeri =

Scientific classification
- Kingdom: Animalia
- Phylum: Mollusca
- Class: Gastropoda
- Subclass: Caenogastropoda
- Order: Neogastropoda
- Family: Terebridae
- Genus: Hastula
- Species: H. knockeri

Binomial name
- Hastula knockeri (E.A. Smith, 1872)

Synonyms
- Terebra knockeri E.A. Smith, 1872

Species of sea snail

Hastula knockeri is a species of sea snail, a marine gastropod mollusc in the family Terebridae, the auger snails.
