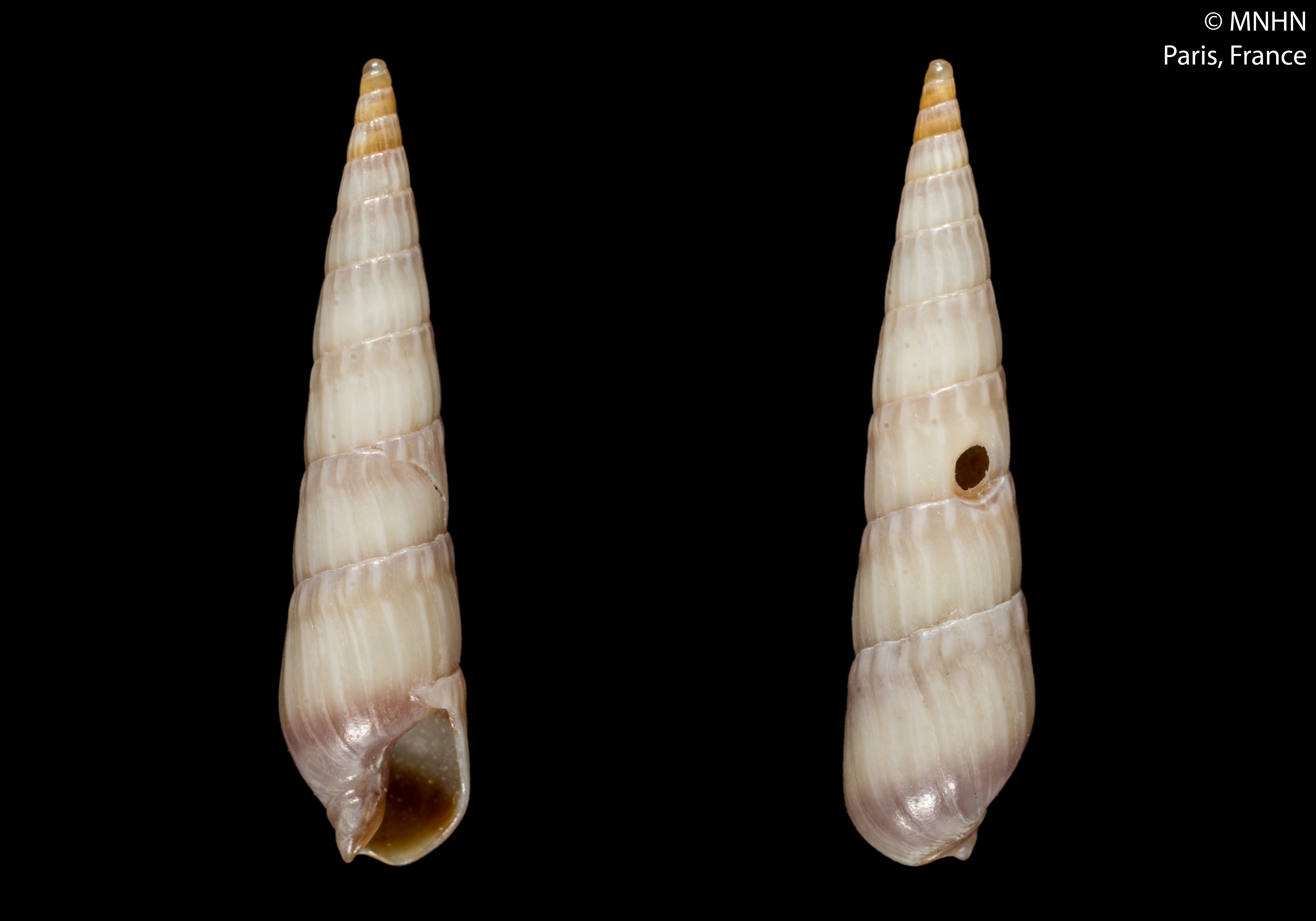
- Shell of Hastula androyensis (holotype at MNHN, Paris)

Scientific classification
- Kingdom: Animalia
- Phylum: Mollusca
- Class: Gastropoda
- Subclass: Caenogastropoda
- Order: Neogastropoda
- Family: Terebridae
- Genus: Hastula
- Species: H. androyensis

Binomial name
- Hastula androyensis Bozzetti, 2008

= Hastula androyensis =

Species of gastropod

Hastula androyensis is a species of sea snail, a marine gastropod mollusk in the family Terebridae, commonly referred to as the auger snails.

== Description ==
The length of the shell attains 12.8 mm.

== Distribution ==
This marine species occurs off Madagascar.
