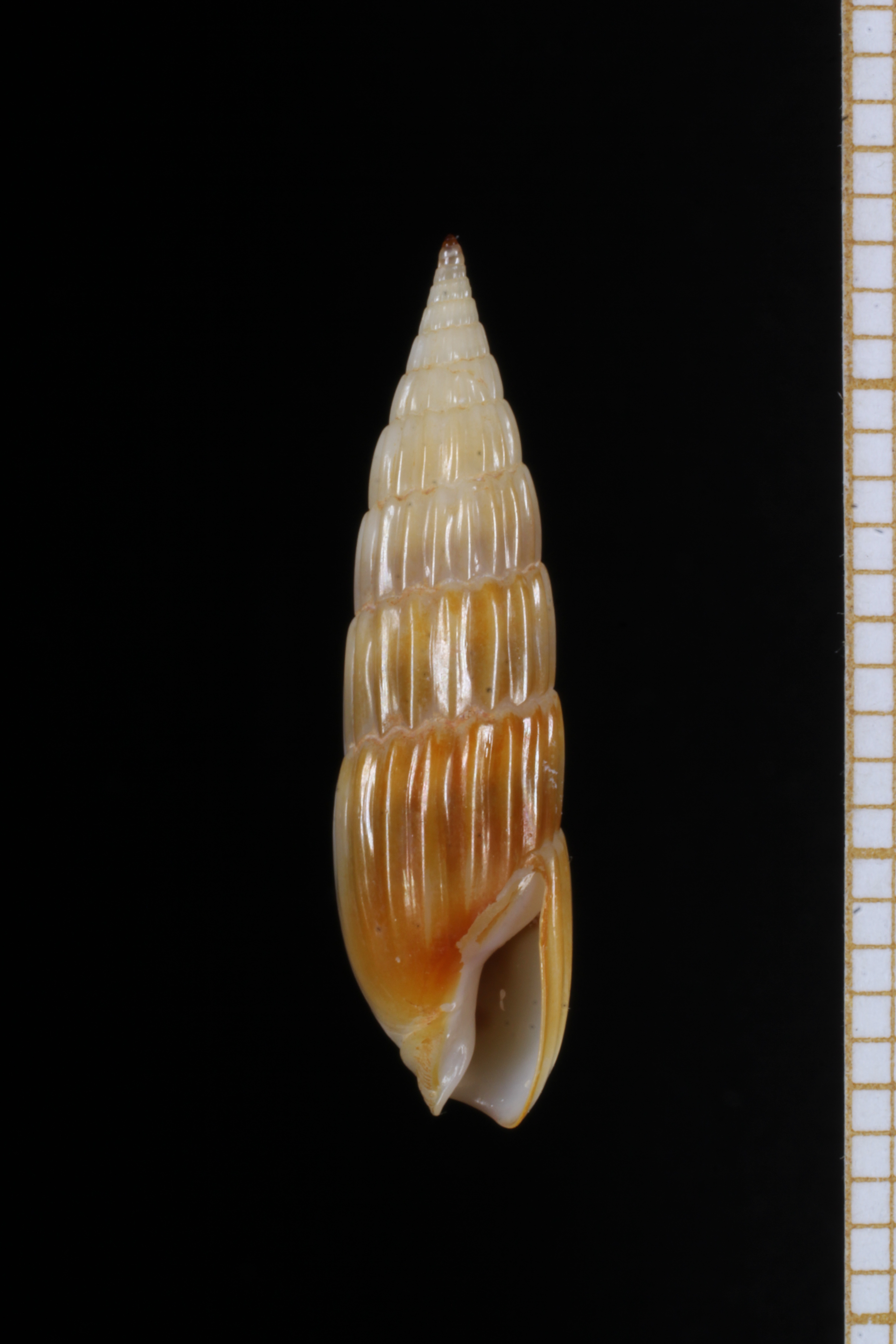
- Shell of Hastula hastata (specimen at MNHN, Paris)

Scientific classification
- Kingdom: Animalia
- Phylum: Mollusca
- Class: Gastropoda
- Subclass: Caenogastropoda
- Order: Neogastropoda
- Family: Terebridae
- Genus: Hastula
- Species: H. hastata

Binomial name
- Hastula hastata (Gmelin, 1791)

Synonyms
- Buccinum hastatum Gmelin, 1791; Terebra costata Menke, 1828; Terebra crassula Deshayes, 1859; Terebra hastata (Gmelin, 1791)

= Hastula hastata =

Species of gastropod

Hastula hastata is a species of sea snail in the family Terebridae, the auger snails. It is known by the common name shiny auger.

== Distribution ==
This snail is native to the coast of the western Atlantic Ocean, where it occurs from Florida to Brazil.; also off Martinique and Barbados.

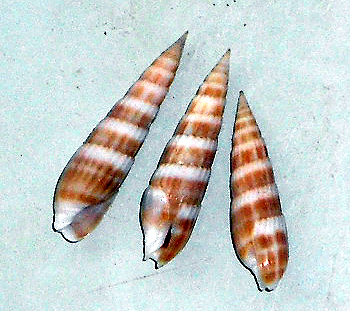
Three shells of Hastula hastata, from South coast of Barbados, in 3 m. depth, in sand
