= Hastula philippiana =

Scientific classification
- Kingdom: Animalia
- Phylum: Mollusca
- Class: Gastropoda
- Subclass: Caenogastropoda
- Order: Neogastropoda
- Family: Terebridae
- Genus: Hastula
- Species: H. philippiana

Binomial name
- Hastula philippiana (Deshayes, 1859)

Synonyms
- Terebra philippiana Deshayes, 1859

Species of gastropod

Hastula philippiana is a species of sea snail, a marine gastropod mollusc in the family Terebridae, the auger snails.
