= Hastula rossacki =

Scientific classification
- Kingdom: Animalia
- Phylum: Mollusca
- Class: Gastropoda
- Subclass: Caenogastropoda
- Order: Neogastropoda
- Family: Terebridae
- Genus: Hastula
- Species: H. rossacki

Binomial name
- Hastula rossacki Sprague, 2000

Species of gastropod

Hastula rossacki is a species of sea snail, a marine gastropod mollusc in the family Terebridae, the auger snails.
