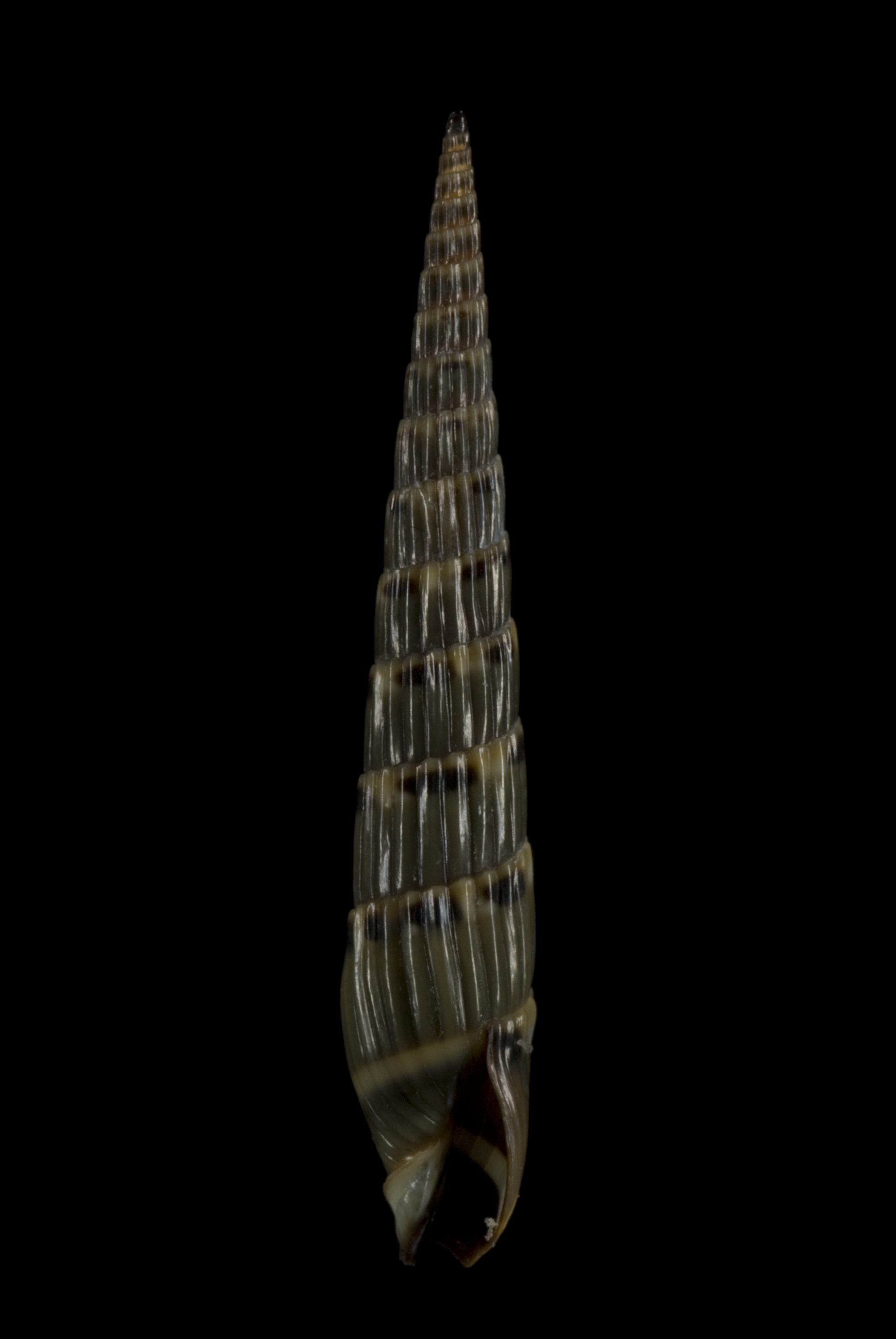
- Shell of Hastula acumen (specimen at MNHN, Paris)

Scientific classification
- Kingdom: Animalia
- Phylum: Mollusca
- Class: Gastropoda
- Subclass: Caenogastropoda
- Order: Neogastropoda
- Family: Terebridae
- Genus: Hastula
- Species: H. acumen

Binomial name
- Hastula acumen (Deshayes, 1859)

Synonyms
- Terebra acumen Deshayes, 1859

= Hastula acumen =

Species of gastropod

Hastula acumen is a species of sea snail, a marine gastropod mollusk in the family Terebridae, the auger snails.

== Distribution ==
This marine species occurs off Papua New Guinea.
