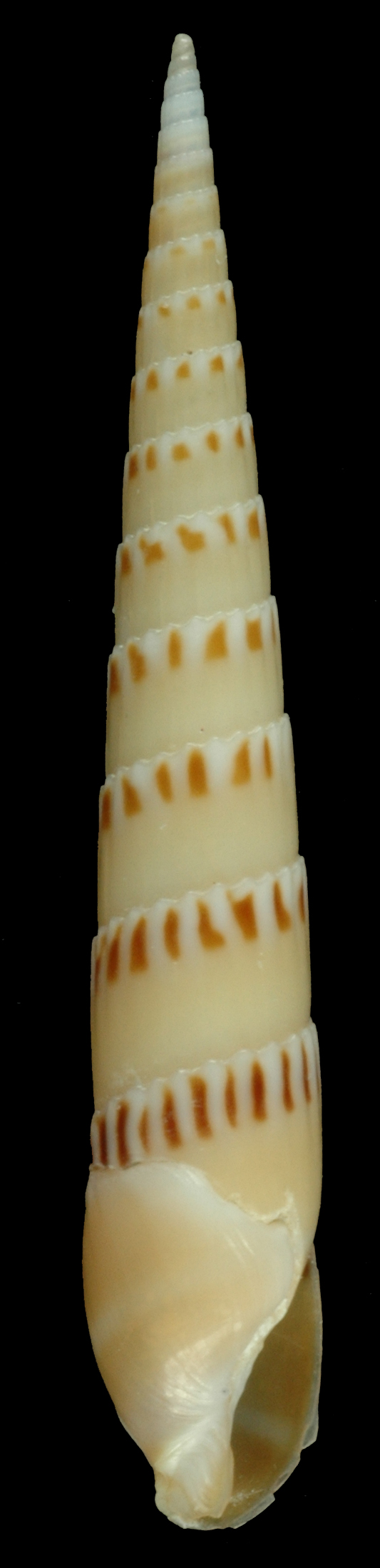
- Shell of Hastula puella (specimen at MNHN, Paris)

Scientific classification
- Kingdom: Animalia
- Phylum: Mollusca
- Class: Gastropoda
- Subclass: Caenogastropoda
- Order: Neogastropoda
- Family: Terebridae
- Genus: Hastula
- Species: H. puella

Binomial name
- Hastula puella (Thiele, 1925)

Synonyms
- Terebra puella Thiele, 1925

= Hastula puella =

Species of gastropod

Hastula puella is a species of sea snail, a marine gastropod mollusc in the family Terebridae, the auger snails.

== Description ==
The length of the shell attains 18 mm.

== Distribution ==
This marine species occurs off Indonesia, Melanesia, and Papua New Guinea.
