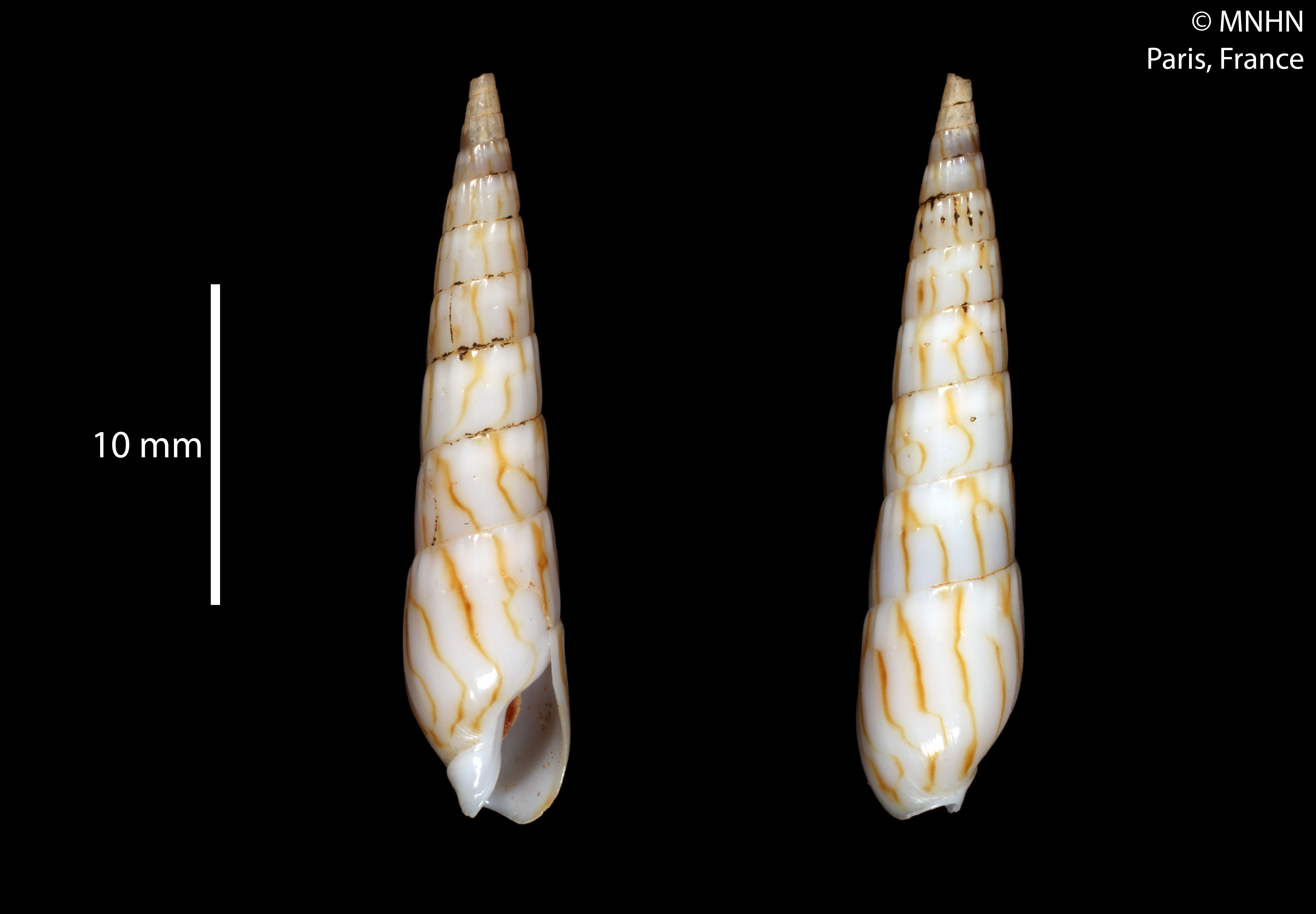
- Shell of Hastula penicillata (specimen at MNHN, Paris)

Scientific classification
- Kingdom: Animalia
- Phylum: Mollusca
- Class: Gastropoda
- Subclass: Caenogastropoda
- Order: Neogastropoda
- Family: Terebridae
- Genus: Hastula
- Species: H. penicillata

Binomial name
- Hastula penicillata (Hinds, 1844)

Synonyms
- Acuminia penicillata (Hinds, 1844); Acuminia venosa (Hinds, 1844); Hastula betsyae Burch, 1965; Terebra penicillata Hinds, 1844; Terebra venosa Hinds, 1844

= Hastula penicillata =

Species of gastropod

Hastula penicillata is a species of sea snail, a marine gastropod mollusc in the family Terebridae, the auger snails.

== Description ==
The length of the shell varies between 25 mm and 40 mm.

== Distribution ==
This marine species occurs off the Seychelles and Madagascar; off Easter Island and Hawaii; off New Zealand.
