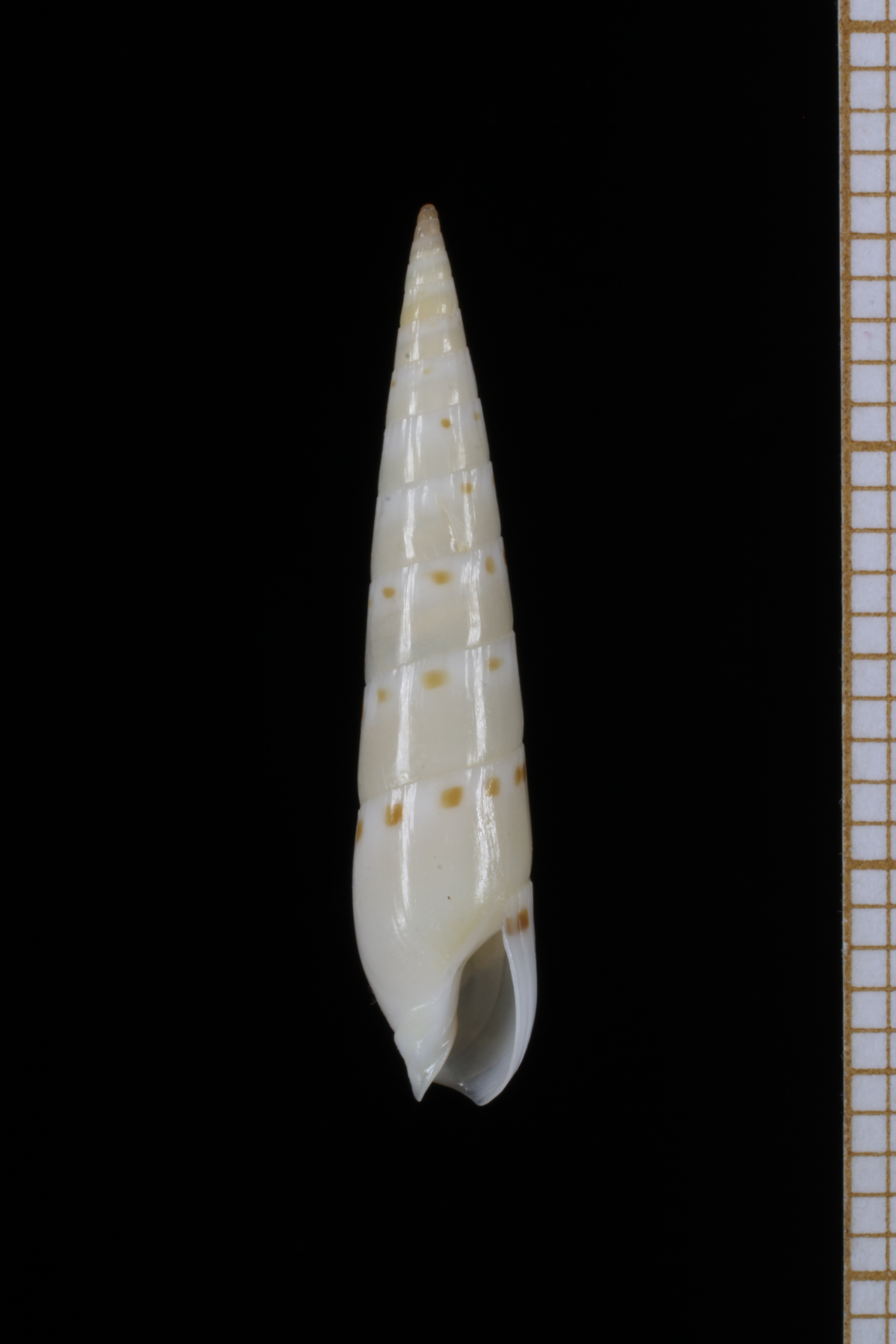
- Shell of Hastula parva (specimen at MNHN, Paris

Scientific classification
- Kingdom: Animalia
- Phylum: Mollusca
- Class: Gastropoda
- Subclass: Caenogastropoda
- Order: Neogastropoda
- Family: Terebridae
- Genus: Hastula
- Species: H. parva

Binomial name
- Hastula parva (Baird, 1873)

Synonyms
- Terebra parva Baird in Brenchley, 1873

= Hastula parva =

Species of gastropod

Hastula parva is a species of sea snail, a marine gastropod mollusk in the family Terebridae, the auger snails.

== Distribution ==
This marine species occurs off New Caledonia.
