= Hastula colorata =

Scientific classification
- Kingdom: Animalia
- Phylum: Mollusca
- Class: Gastropoda
- Subclass: Caenogastropoda
- Order: Neogastropoda
- Family: Terebridae
- Genus: Hastula
- Species: H. colorata

Binomial name
- Hastula colorata Bratcher, 1988

Synonyms
- Terebra colorata Bratcher, 1988

Species of gastropod

Hastula colorata is a species of sea snail, a marine gastropod mollusk in the family Terebridae, the auger snails.

This is a taxon inquirendum. It is possibly a species of Columbellidae according to Terryn (2007).
