= Hastula celidonota =

Scientific classification
- Kingdom: Animalia
- Phylum: Mollusca
- Class: Gastropoda
- Subclass: Caenogastropoda
- Order: Neogastropoda
- Family: Terebridae
- Genus: Hastula
- Species: H. celidonota

Binomial name
- Hastula celidonota (Melvill & Sykes, 1898)

Synonyms
- Terebra celidonota Melvill & Sykes, 1898

Species of gastropod

Hastula celidonota is a species of sea snail, a marine gastropod mollusc in the family Terebridae, the auger snails.

== Distribution ==
Mascarene Islands
