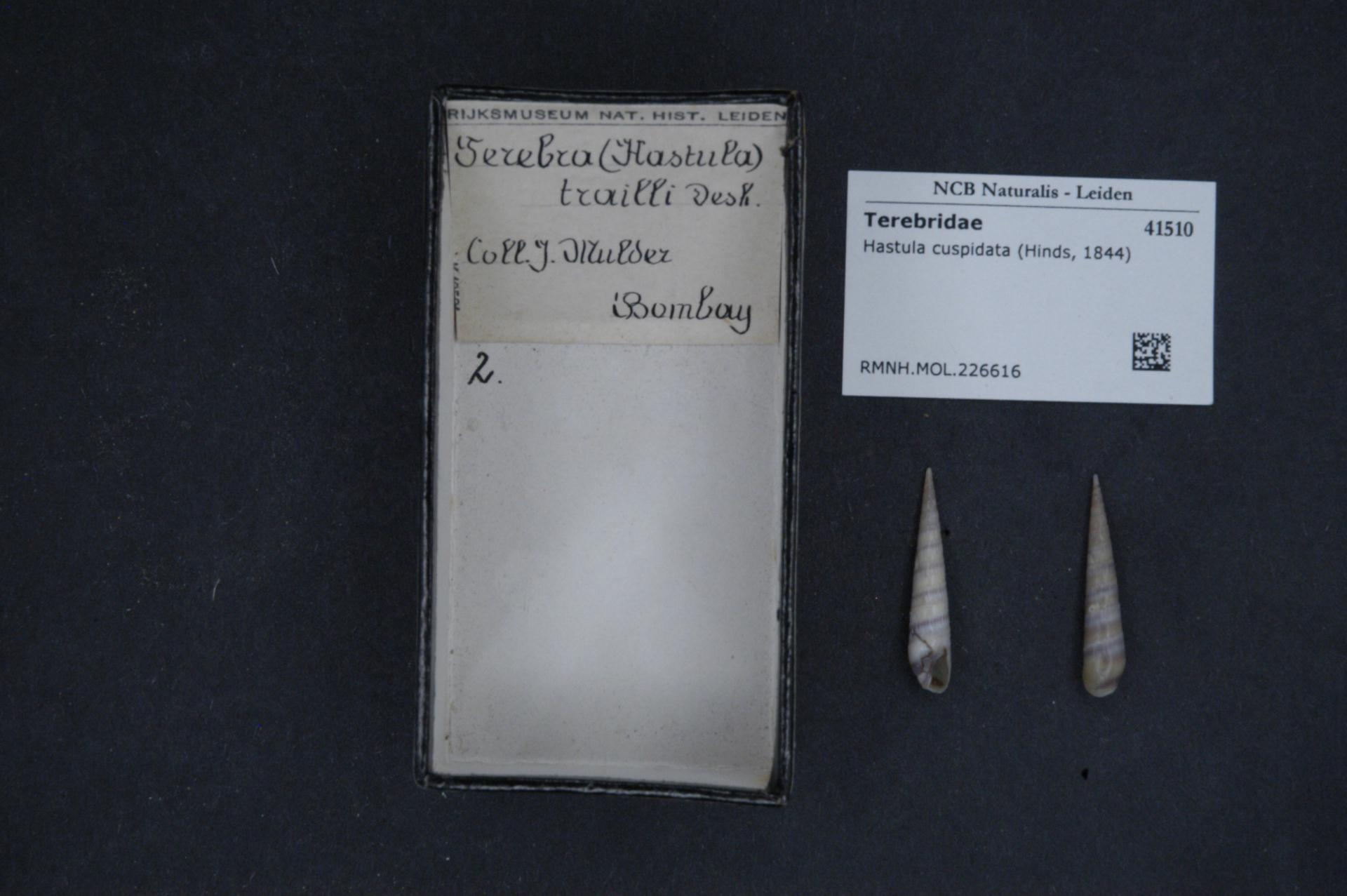

Scientific classification
- Kingdom: Animalia
- Phylum: Mollusca
- Class: Gastropoda
- Subclass: Caenogastropoda
- Order: Neogastropoda
- Family: Terebridae
- Genus: Hastula
- Species: H. cuspidata

Binomial name
- Hastula cuspidata (Hinds, 1844)

Synonyms
- Terebra cuspidata Hinds, 1844; Terebra traillii Deshayes, 1859

= Hastula cuspidata =

Species of gastropod

Hastula cuspidata is a species of sea snail, a marine gastropod mollusc in the family Terebridae, the auger snails.
