= Hastula leloeuffi =

- Specimen from the molluscs collection of the Muséum national d'Histoire naturelle in Paris.

Scientific classification
- Kingdom: Animalia
- Phylum: Mollusca
- Class: Gastropoda
- Subclass: Caenogastropoda
- Order: Neogastropoda
- Family: Terebridae
- Genus: Hastula
- Species: H. leloeuffi

Binomial name
- Hastula leloeuffi Bouchet, 1982

Species of gastropod

Hastula leloeuffi is a species of sea snail, a marine gastropod mollusc in the family Terebridae, the auger snails.

== Distribution ==
This marine species occurs off Ivory Coast.
