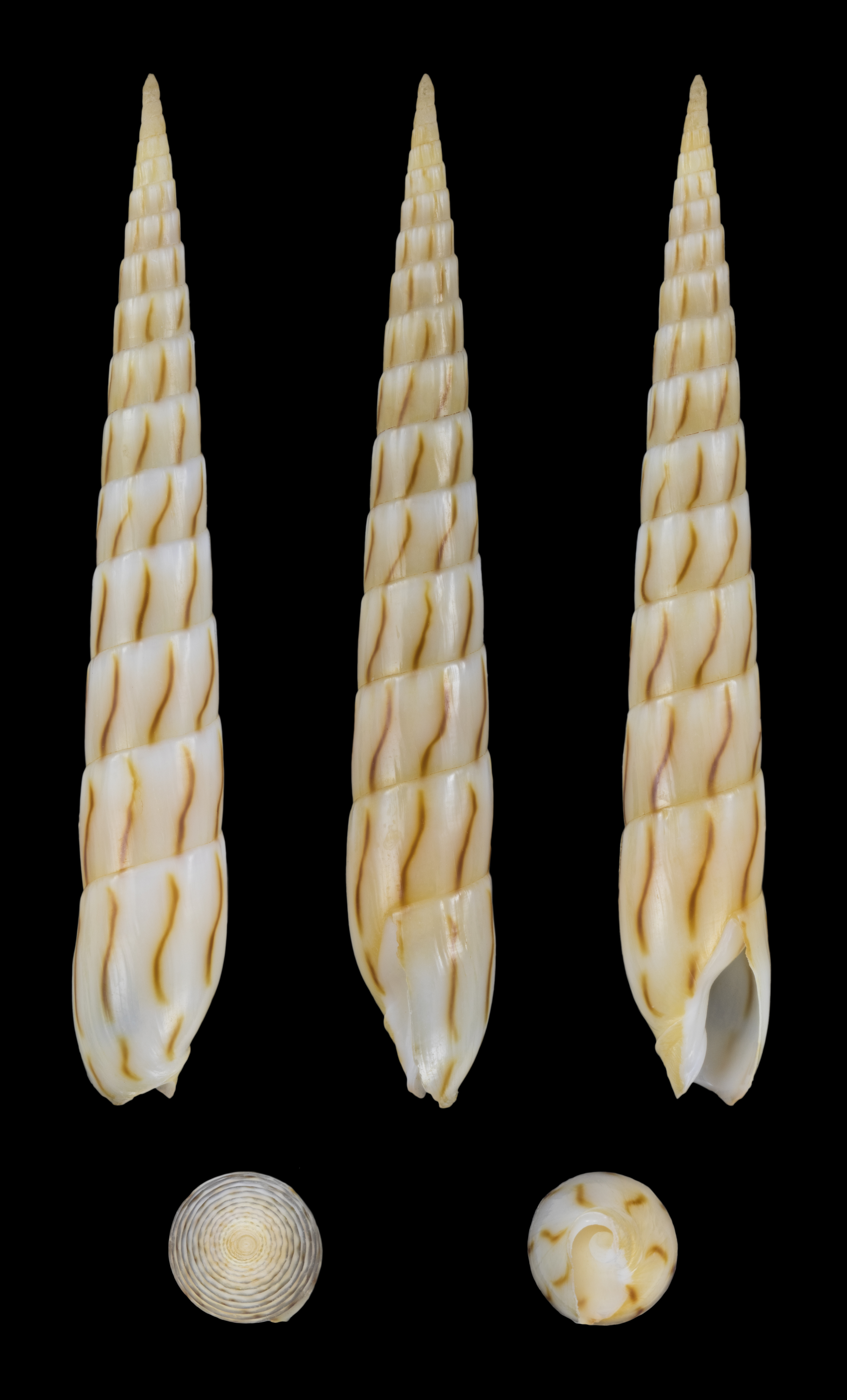
- Shell of Hastula lanceata

Scientific classification
- Kingdom: Animalia
- Phylum: Mollusca
- Class: Gastropoda
- Subclass: Caenogastropoda
- Order: Neogastropoda
- Superfamily: Conoidea
- Family: Terebridae
- Genus: Hastula
- Species: H. lanceata

Binomial name
- Hastula lanceata (Linnaeus, 1767)

Synonyms
- Acuminia lanceata Okutani, 1975; Buccinum lanceatum Linnaeus, 1767; Terebra lanceata (Linnaeus, 1767); Terebra lanceata oahuensis Pilsbry, 1921; Terebra oahuensis (Pilsbry, 1921)

= Hastula lanceata =

Species of sea snail

Hastula lanceata is a species of sea snail, a marine gastropod mollusk in the family Terebridae, the auger snails.

== Description ==
Shell size 62 mm.

== Distribution ==
This marine species occurs off Papua New Guinea, and Queensland, Australia.
