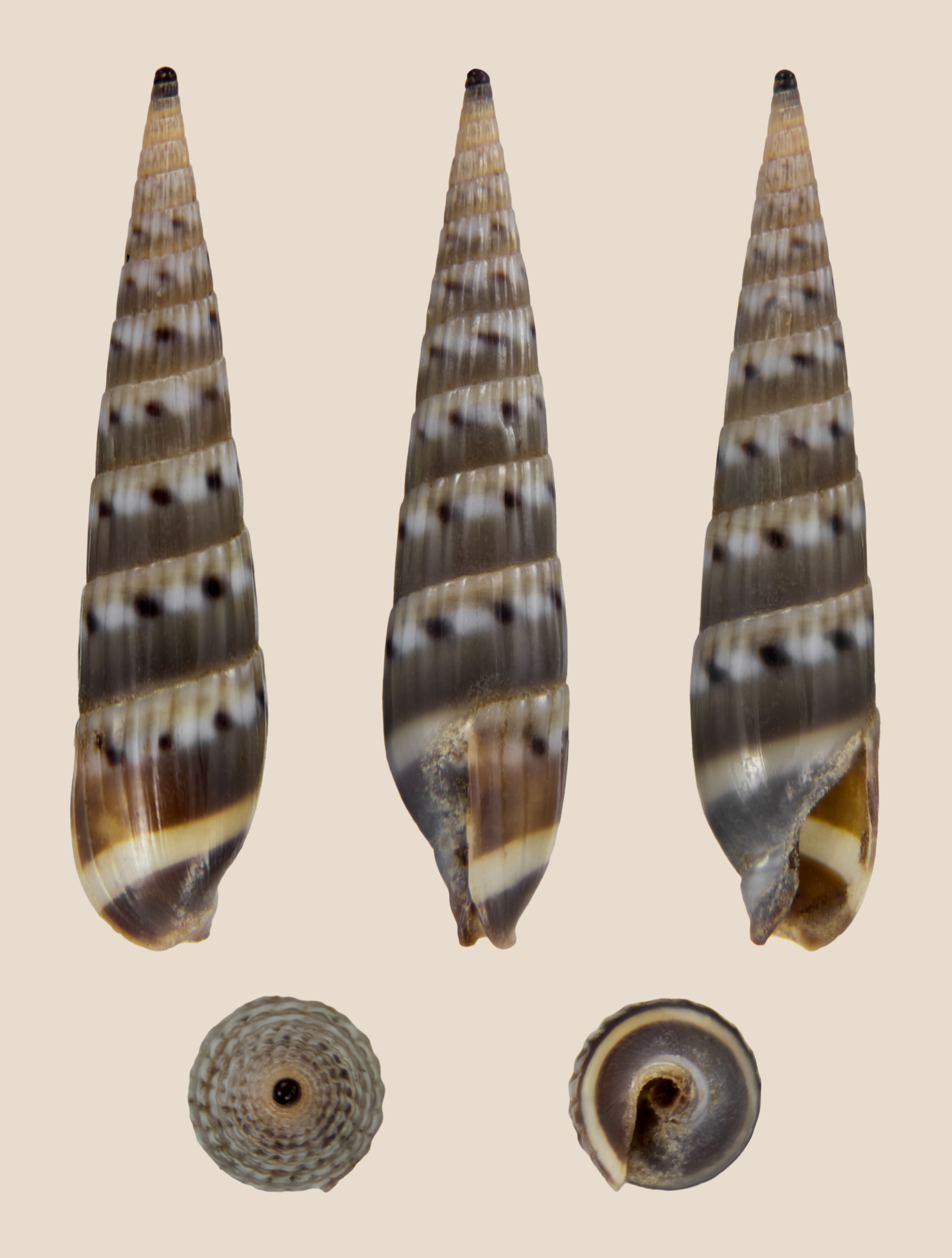
- A shell of Hastula strigilata

Scientific classification
- Kingdom: Animalia
- Phylum: Mollusca
- Class: Gastropoda
- Subclass: Caenogastropoda
- Order: Neogastropoda
- Family: Terebridae
- Genus: Hastula
- Species: H. strigilata

Binomial name
- Hastula strigilata (Linnaeus, 1758)

Synonyms
- Buccinum concinnum Dillwyn, 1817; Buccinum concinnum Wood, 1825; Buccinum strigilatum Linnaeus, 1758; Hastula verreauxi Deshayes, 1857; Terebra argenvillii Deshayes, 1859; Terebra striatula Kiener, 1839; Terebra strigilata (Linnaeus, 1758); Terebra strigilata gracilior Thiele, 1925; Terebra verreauxi Deshayes, 1857; Vertagus strigilatus (Linnaeus, 1758)

= Hastula strigilata =

Species of gastropod

Hastula strigilata, common name the strigate auger, the strigillate auger or the combed auger, is a species of sea snail, a marine gastropod mollusc in the family Terebridae, the auger snails.

== Description ==
The length of the shell varies between 18 mm and 56 mm.

== Distribution ==
This species occurs in the Red Sea, the Arabian Sea, in the Indian Ocean off Madagascar, Chagos; and the Mascarene Basin; in the Pacific off Hawaii and French Polynesia.
