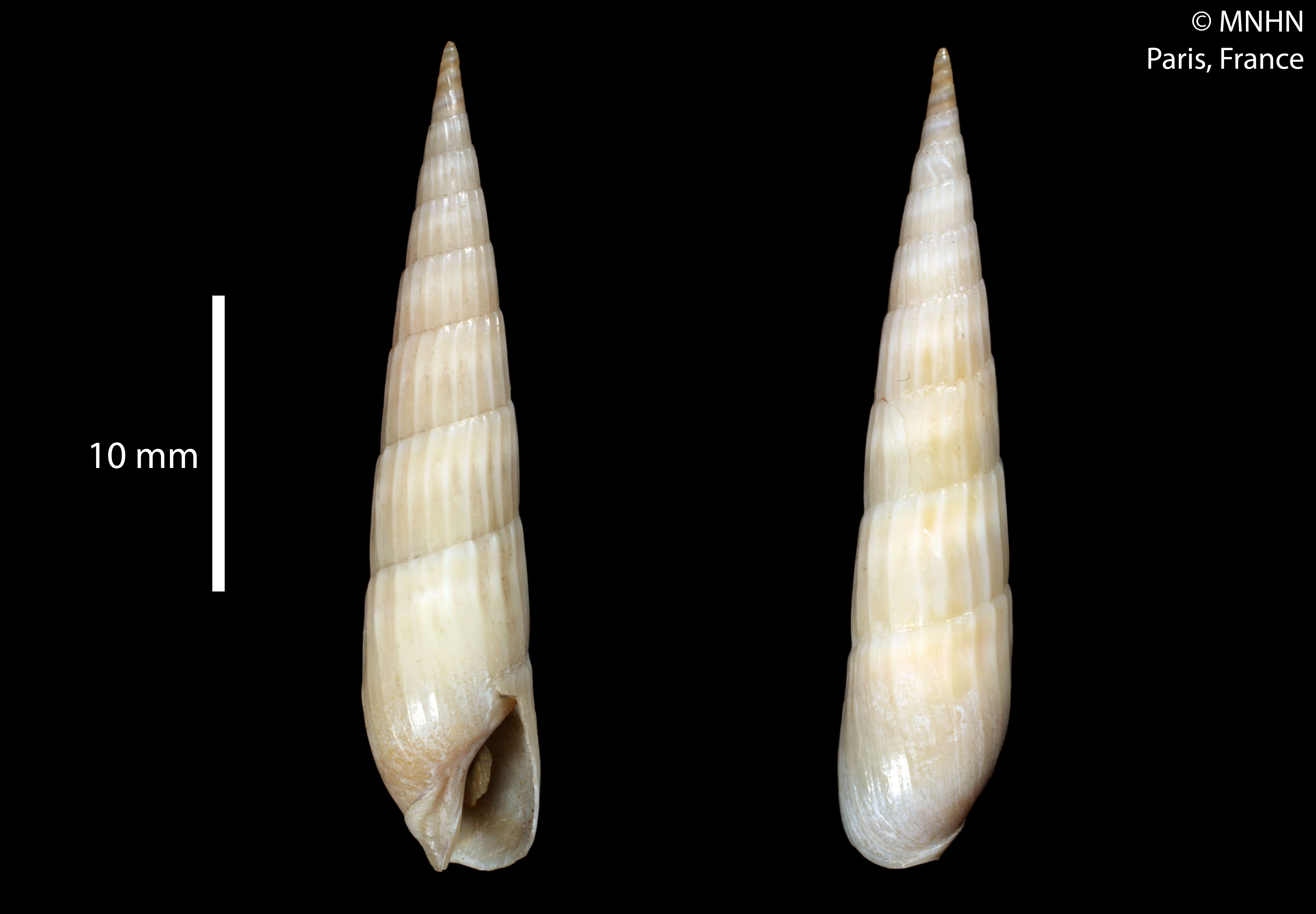
- Shell of Hastula continua

Scientific classification
- Kingdom: Animalia
- Phylum: Mollusca
- Class: Gastropoda
- Subclass: Caenogastropoda
- Order: Neogastropoda
- Family: Terebridae
- Genus: Hastula
- Species: H. continua

Binomial name
- Hastula continua (Deshayes, 1859)

Synonyms
- Images continua (Deshayes, 1859); Terebra continua Deshayes, 1859

= Hastula continua =

Species of gastropod

Hastula continua is a species of sea snail, a marine gastropod mollusc in the family Terebridae, the auger snails.

== Description ==
The length of the shell attains 33 mm.

== Distribution ==
This marine species occurs off Japan.
