= Hastula cernohorskyi =

Scientific classification
- Kingdom: Animalia
- Phylum: Mollusca
- Class: Gastropoda
- Subclass: Caenogastropoda
- Order: Neogastropoda
- Family: Terebridae
- Genus: Hastula
- Species: H. cernohorskyi

Binomial name
- Hastula cernohorskyi Burch, 1965

Synonyms
- Impages bacillus (Deshayes, 1859); Terebra bacillus Deshayes, 1859 (original combination); Terebra lactea Deshayes, 1859

Species of gastropod

Hastula cernohorskyi is a species of sea snail, a marine gastropod mollusc in the family Terebridae, the auger snails.
