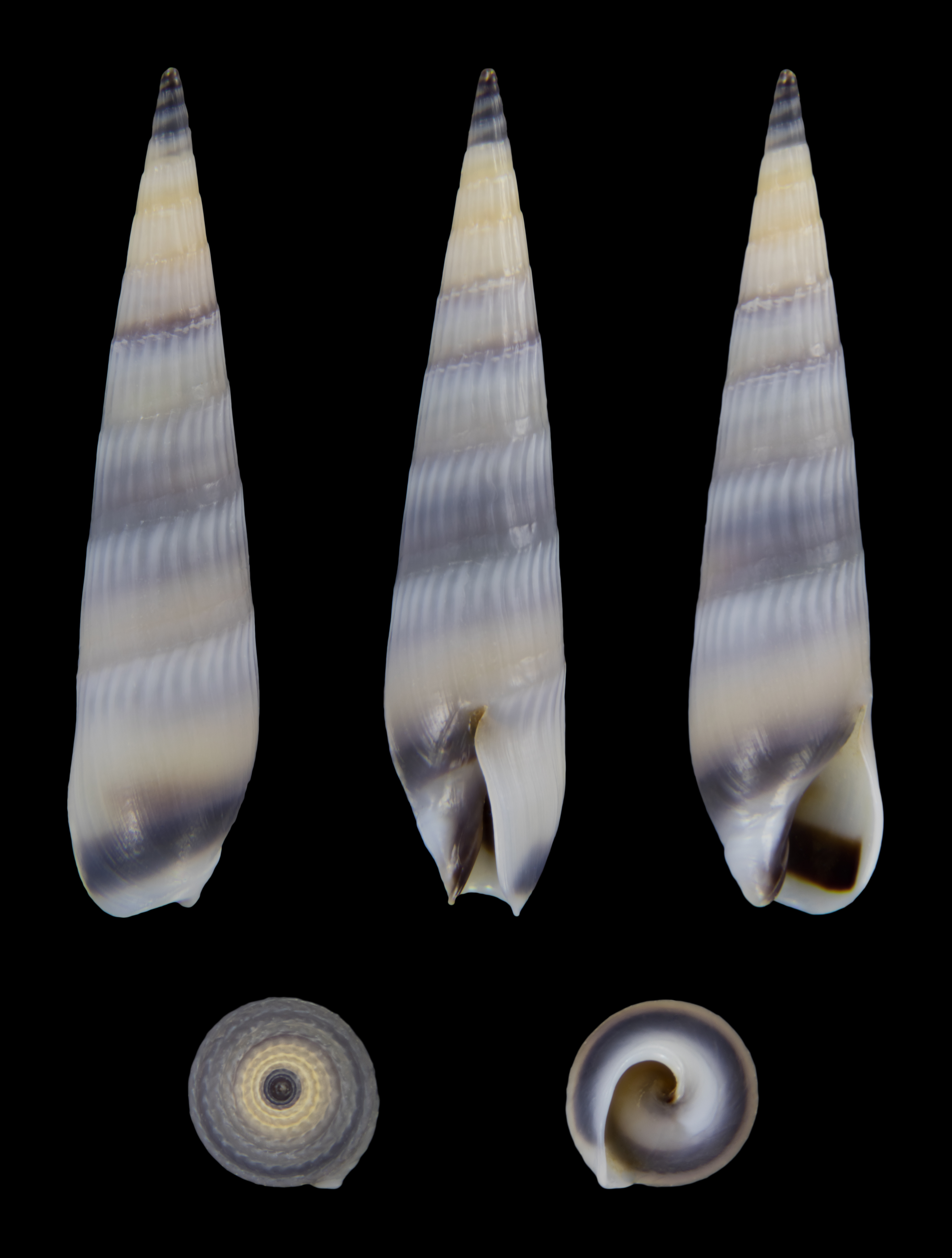
- Shell of Hastula bacillus

Scientific classification
- Kingdom: Animalia
- Phylum: Mollusca
- Class: Gastropoda
- Subclass: Caenogastropoda
- Order: Neogastropoda
- Family: Terebridae
- Genus: Hastula
- Species: H. bacillus

Binomial name
- Hastula bacillus (Deshayes, 1859)

Synonyms
- Impages bacillus (Deshayes, 1859); Terebra bacillus Deshayes, 1859; Terebra lactea Deshayes, 1859

= Hastula bacillus =

Species of gastropod

Hastula bacillus is a species of sea snail, a marine gastropod mollusc in the family Terebridae, the auger snails.

== Description ==
The length of the shell varies between 13 mm and 27 mm.

== Distribution ==
This marine species occurs off Sri Lanka and Western Thailand, Indonesia, Japan, and Hawaii.
