= Hastula nana =

Scientific classification
- Kingdom: Animalia
- Phylum: Mollusca
- Class: Gastropoda
- Subclass: Caenogastropoda
- Order: Neogastropoda
- Family: Terebridae
- Genus: Hastula
- Species: H. nana

Binomial name
- Hastula nana (Deshayes, 1859)

Synonyms
- Impages nana (Deshayes, 1859); Terebra nana Deshayes, 1859

Species of gastropod

Hastula nana is a species of sea snail, a marine gastropod mollusc in the family Terebridae, the auger snails.

== Description ==
The length of the shell varies between 12 mm and 18 mm.

== Distribution ==
This species occurs in the Persian Gulf and in the Arabian Sea.
