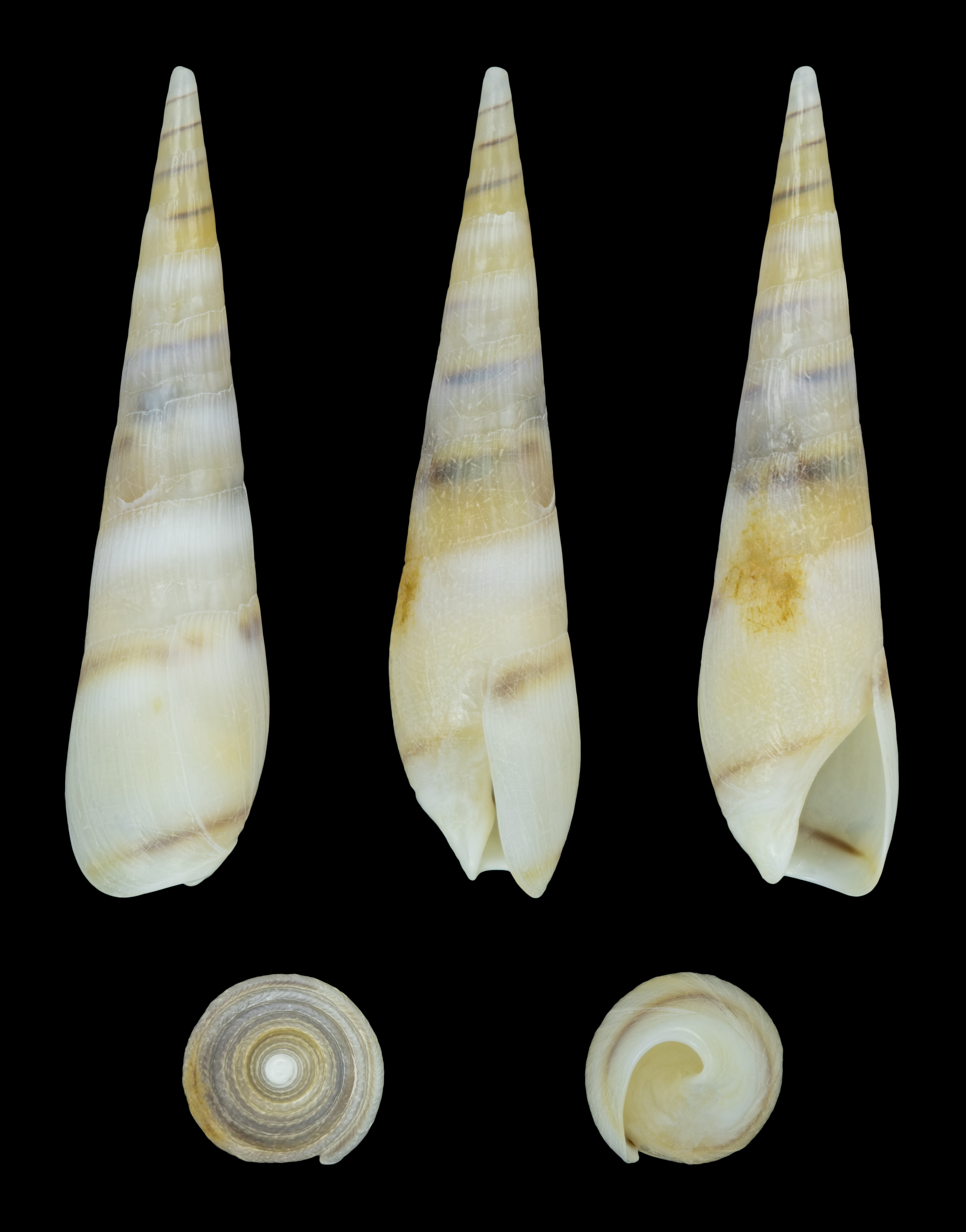
- Shell of Hastula aciculina (paralectotype at MNHN, Paris)

Scientific classification
- Kingdom: Animalia
- Phylum: Mollusca
- Class: Gastropoda
- Subclass: Caenogastropoda
- Order: Neogastropoda
- Family: Terebridae
- Genus: Hastula
- Species: H. aciculina

Binomial name
- Hastula aciculina (Lamarck, 1822)

Synonyms
- Hastula micans (Hinds, 1844); Impages aciculina (Lamarck, 1822); Terebra aciculina Lamarck, 1822; Terebra adansoni Deshayes, 1859; Terebra micans Hinds, 1844

= Hastula aciculina =

Species of gastropod

Hastula aciculina is a species of sea snail, a marine gastropod mollusk in the family Terebridae, the auger snails.

== Distribution ==
This marine species occurs off Senegal.
