= Hastula stylata =

Scientific classification
- Kingdom: Animalia
- Phylum: Mollusca
- Class: Gastropoda
- Subclass: Caenogastropoda
- Order: Neogastropoda
- Family: Terebridae
- Genus: Hastula
- Species: H. stylata

Binomial name
- Hastula stylata (Hinds, 1844)

Synonyms
- Impages stylata (Hinds, 1844); Terebra stylata Hinds, 1844

Species of gastropod

Hastula stylata, common name the wide-mouth auger, is a species of sea snail, a marine gastropod mollusk in the family Terebridae, the auger snails.

== Description ==
The length of the shell varies between 15 mm and 50 mm.

== Distribution ==
This marine species occurs off Mauritius, Japan and Easter Island; not off Hawaii.
