= Hastula daniae =

Scientific classification
- Kingdom: Animalia
- Phylum: Mollusca
- Class: Gastropoda
- Subclass: Caenogastropoda
- Order: Neogastropoda
- Family: Terebridae
- Genus: Hastula
- Species: H. daniae

Binomial name
- Hastula daniae (Aubry, 2008)

Synonyms
- Impages daniae (Aubry, 2008); Terebra daniae Aubry, 2008 (original combination)

Species of gastropod

Hastula daniae is a species of sea snail, a marine gastropod mollusk in the family Terebridae, the auger snails.
