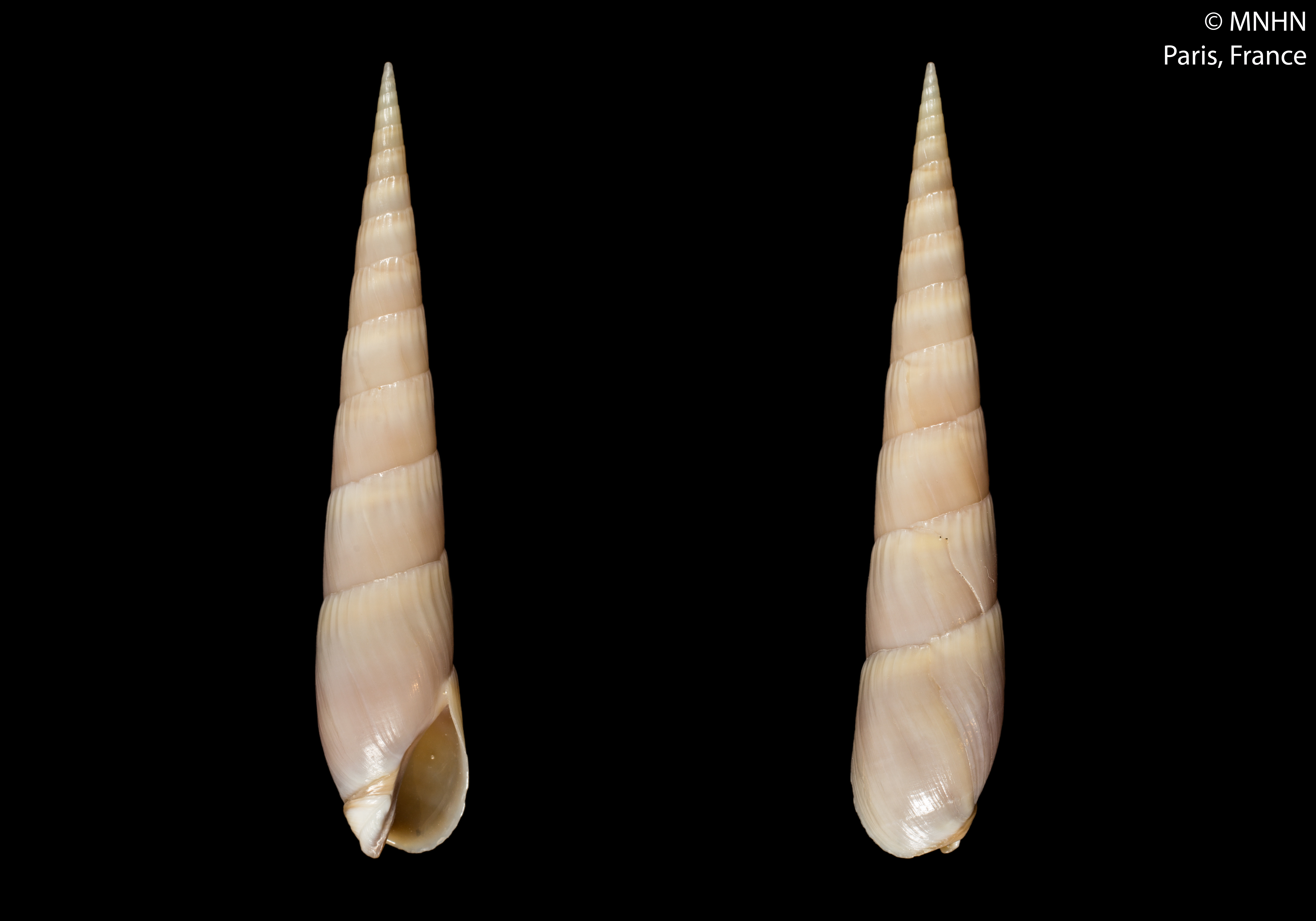
- Shell of Hastula escondida (holotype at MNHN, Paris)

Scientific classification
- Kingdom: Animalia
- Phylum: Mollusca
- Class: Gastropoda
- Subclass: Caenogastropoda
- Order: Neogastropoda
- Family: Terebridae
- Genus: Hastula
- Species: H. escondida

Binomial name
- Hastula escondida (Terryn, 2006)

Synonyms
- Impages escondida Terryn, 2006 (original combination)

= Hastula escondida =

Species of gastropod

Hastula escondida is a species of sea snail, a marine gastropod mollusc in the family Terebridae, the auger snails.

== Description ==
The length of the shell attains 61 mm.

== Distribution ==
This marine species occurs off Madagascar.
