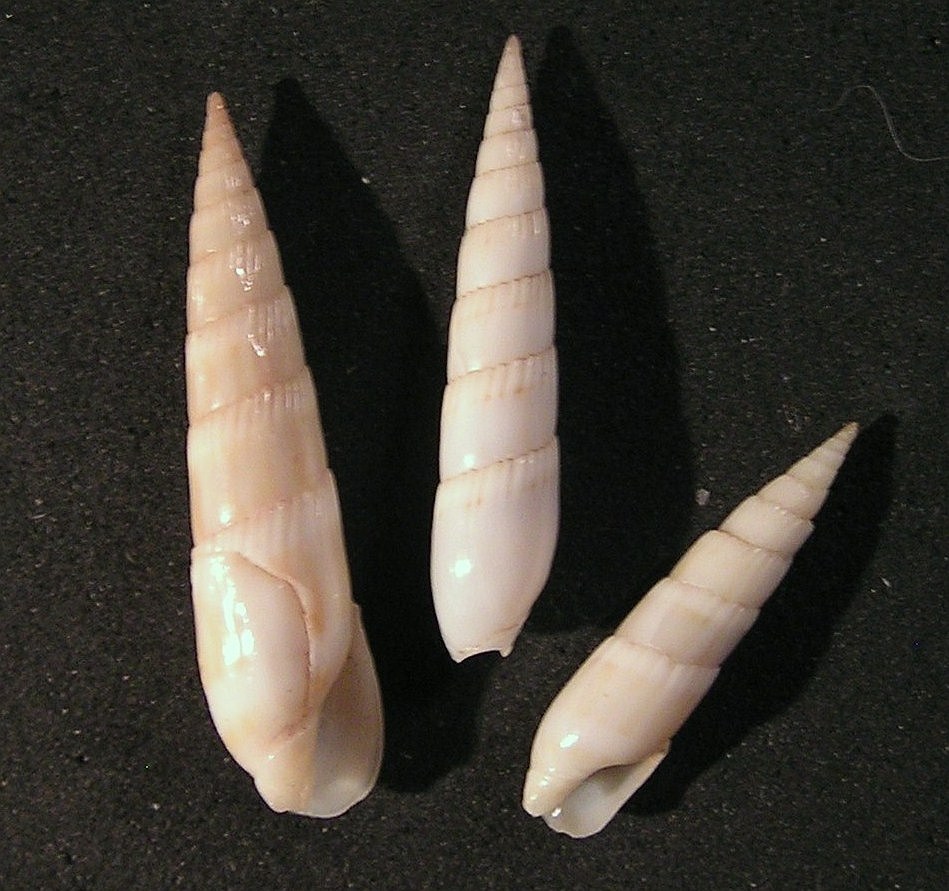
- Several views of a shell of Hastula apicitincta

Scientific classification
- Kingdom: Animalia
- Phylum: Mollusca
- Class: Gastropoda
- Subclass: Caenogastropoda
- Order: Neogastropoda
- Family: Terebridae
- Genus: Hastula
- Species: H. apicitincta

Binomial name
- Hastula apicitincta (G.B. Sowerby III, 1900)

Synonyms
- Columbella eulimoides W. H. Turton, 1932 (junior synonym); Impages apicitincta (G. B. Sowerby III, 1900); Terebra apicitincta G.B. Sowerby III, 1900

= Hastula apicitincta =

Species of gastropod

Hastula apicitincta is a species of sea snail, a marine gastropod mollusc in the family Terebridae, the auger snails.

== Description ==
The length of the shell varies between 15 mm and 22 mm.

== Distribution ==
This marine species occurs off KwaZulu-Natal, South Africa.
