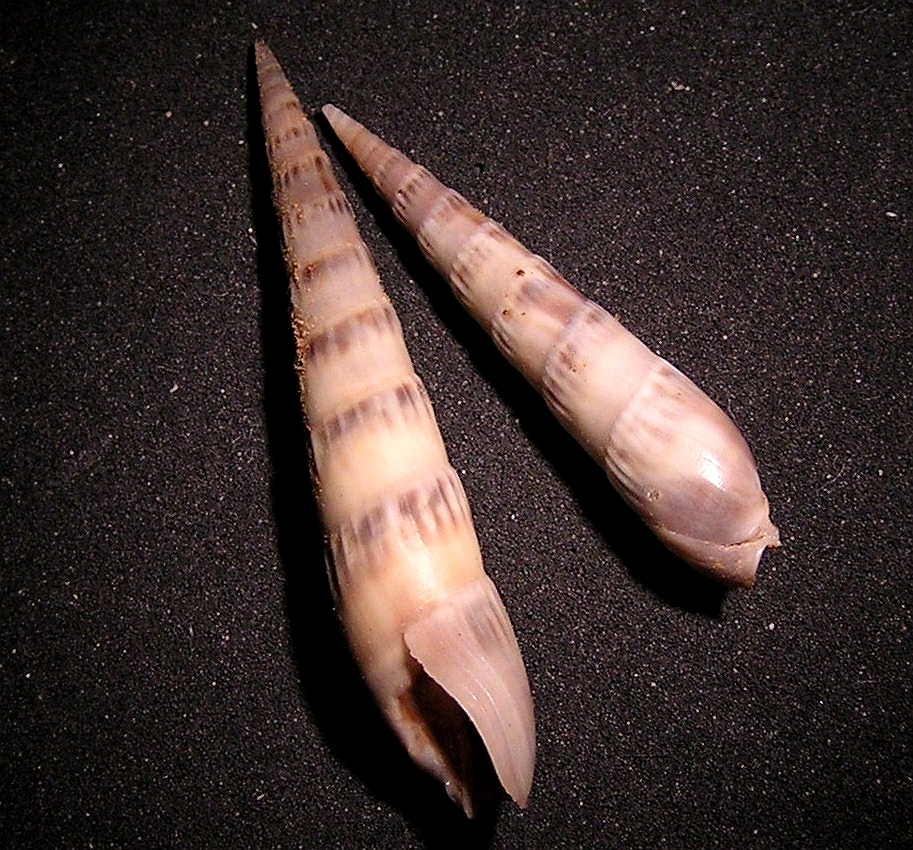
- Several views of a shell of Impages cinerea

Scientific classification
- Kingdom: Animalia
- Phylum: Mollusca
- Class: Gastropoda
- Subclass: Caenogastropoda
- Order: Neogastropoda
- Family: Terebridae
- Genus: Hastula
- Species: H. cinerea

Binomial name
- Hastula cinerea (Born, 1778)

Synonyms
- Buccinum cinereum Born, 1778 (original combination); Hastula luctuosa (Hinds, 1958); Impages cinerea (Born, 1778); Terebra acuta Deshayes, 1857; Terebra cinerea (Born, 1778); Terebra jamaicensis C. B. Adams, 1850; Terebra laurina Hinds, 1844; Terebra luctuosa Hinds, 1844

= Hastula cinerea =

Species of gastropod

Hastula cinerea, the grey Atlantic auger, is a species of sea snail, a marine gastropod mollusc in the family Terebridae, the auger snails.

== Description ==
The length of the shell varies between 16 mm and 68 mm. Protoconch is a very dark/black sharp tip, and a horny brown operculum is present. No periostracum, shell is glossy overall. They tend to have larger feet because it helps stabilize themselves into the sand due to the species of sea snail living in a more active zone of the ocean.

== Distribution ==
This shallow-water species occurs in the Atlantic Ocean off Angola, Cape Verde, Senegal and Brazil; in the Caribbean Sea, the Gulf of Mexico and the Lesser Antilles; in the Indian Ocean off Madagascar. Hastula cinerea are mostly found in intertidal zones, but can also be found in high water-line zones.
