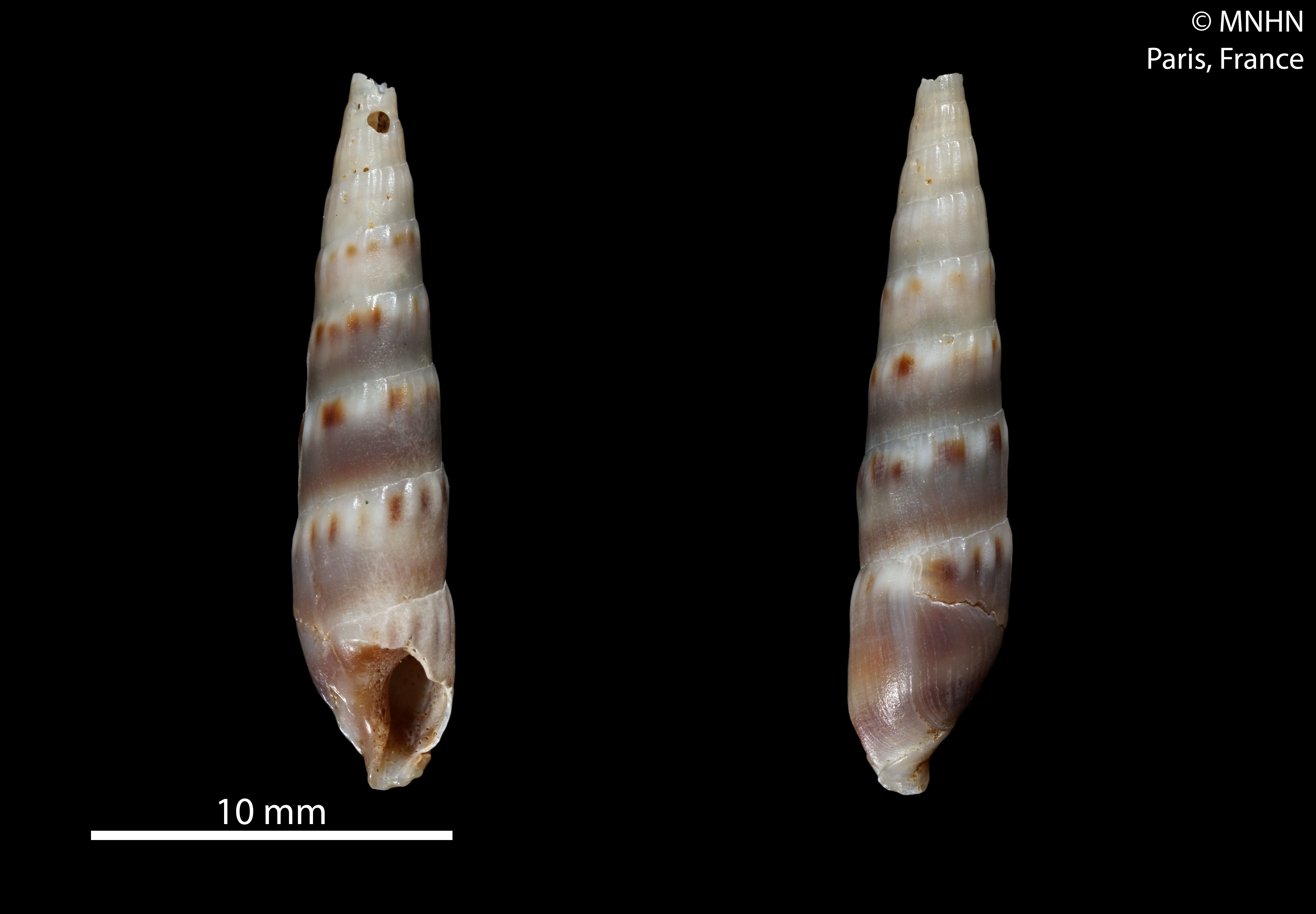
- Shell of Hastula maryleeae

Scientific classification
- Kingdom: Animalia
- Phylum: Mollusca
- Class: Gastropoda
- Subclass: Caenogastropoda
- Order: Neogastropoda
- Family: Terebridae
- Genus: Hastula
- Species: H. maryleeae

Binomial name
- Hastula maryleeae Burch, 1965

Synonyms
- Impages maryleeae (R. D. Burch, 1965); Terebra maryleeae (R. D. Burch, 1965)

= Hastula maryleeae =

Species of sea snail

Hastula maryleeae is a species of sea snail, a marine gastropod mollusc in the family Terebridae, the auger snails.

== Description ==
The length of the shell varies between 14 mm and 30 mm.

== Distribution ==
This marine species occurs off in the Gulf of Mexico off Texas, the United States and in the Caribbean Sea off Belize, specifically Trinidad and Tobago.
