= Hastula marqueti =

Scientific classification
- Kingdom: Animalia
- Phylum: Mollusca
- Class: Gastropoda
- Subclass: Caenogastropoda
- Order: Neogastropoda
- Family: Terebridae
- Genus: Hastula
- Species: H. marqueti

Binomial name
- Hastula marqueti (Aubry, 1994)

Synonyms
- Impages marqueti (Aubry, 1994); Partecosta marqueti (Aubry, 1994)· accepted, alternate representation; Terebra marqueti Aubry, 1994 (original combination)

Species of gastropod

Hastula marqueti is a species of sea snail, a marine gastropod mollusc in the family Terebridae, the auger snails.

== Description ==
The length of the shell varies between 10 mm and 18 mm.

== Distribution ==
This marine species occurs in the Indian Ocean off Kenya.
