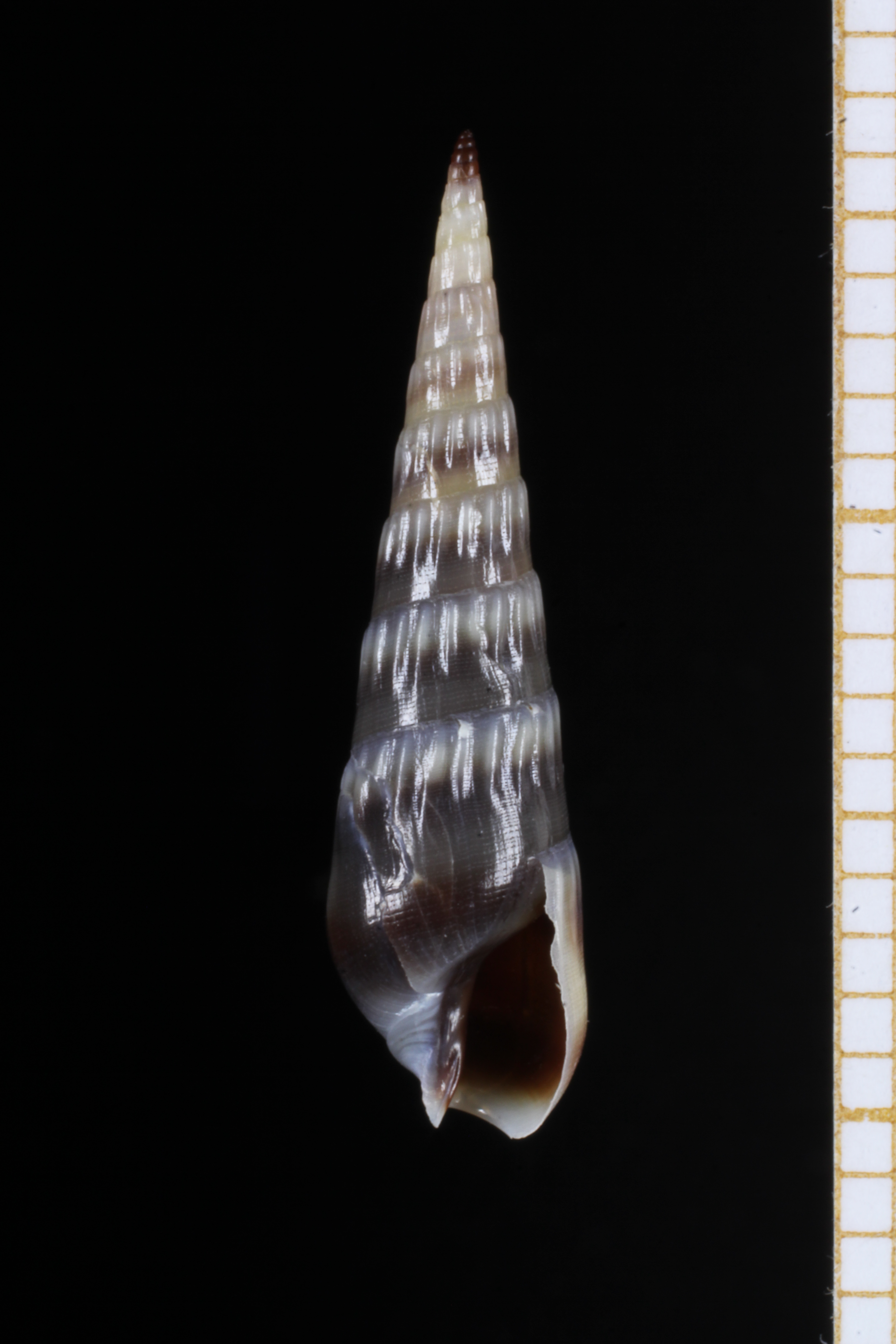
- Shell of Hastula salleana (specimen at MNHN, Paris)

Scientific classification
- Kingdom: Animalia
- Phylum: Mollusca
- Class: Gastropoda
- Subclass: Caenogastropoda
- Order: Neogastropoda
- Family: Terebridae
- Genus: Hastula
- Species: H. salleana

Binomial name
- Hastula salleana (Deshayes, 1859)

Synonyms
- Impages salleana (Deshayes, 1859); Terebra sallaeana Deshayes, 1859 (original spelling); Terebra salleana Deshayes, 1859

= Hastula salleana =

Species of gastropod

Hastula salleana is a species of sea snail, a marine gastropod mollusc in the family Terebridae, the auger snails.

== Description ==
The length of the shell varies between 13 mm and 40 mm.

== Distribution ==
This species occurs in the Gulf of Mexico off Northwest Florida, USA; in the Caribbean Sea off Martinique, Colombia; in the Atlantic Ocean off Central Brazil.
