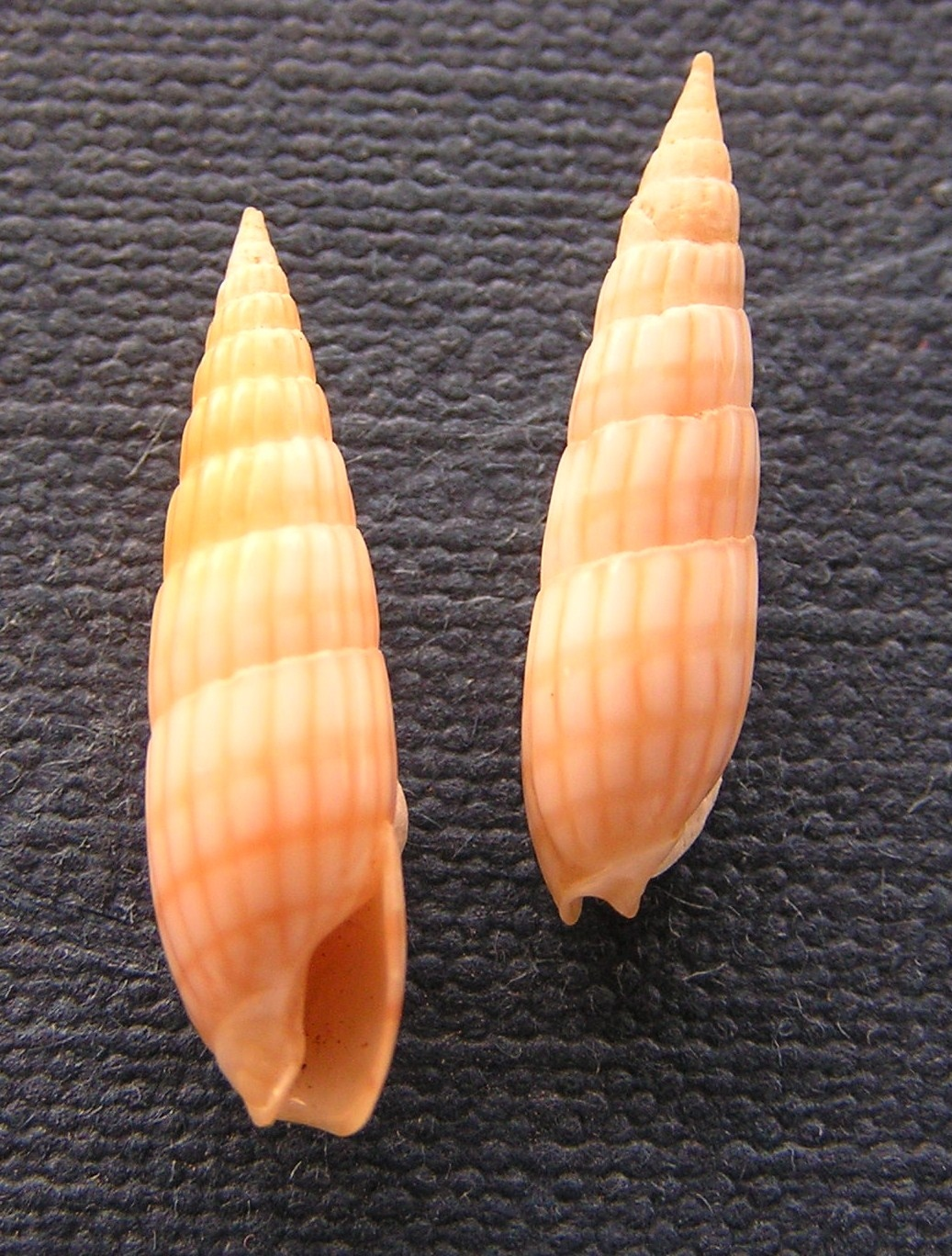
- Two shells of Hastula solida

Scientific classification
- Kingdom: Animalia
- Phylum: Mollusca
- Class: Gastropoda
- Subclass: Caenogastropoda
- Order: Neogastropoda
- Family: Terebridae
- Genus: Hastula; H. Adams & A. Adams, 1853

Type species
- Buccinum strigilatum Linnaeus, 1758

Synonyms
- Acuminia Dall, 1908; Acus (Hastula) H. Adams & A. Adams, 1853 (original rank); Engentelaria Rehder, 1980; Hastulina Oyama, 1961; Impages E. A. Smith, 1873; Terebra (Acuminia) Dall, 1908 (original rank); Terebra (Hastula) H. Adams & A. Adams, 1853

= Hastula =

Genus of gastropods

Hastula is a genus of sea snails, marine gastropod mollusks in the family Terebridae, the auger snails.

== Distribution ==
Species in this genus can be found in the Indo-Pacific Region, Australia and Tasmania.

== Habitat and feeding habits ==
These are sand-dwelling snails that burrow into the sand no deeper than their length. These are carnivorous snails, feeding on polychaete worms.

== Description ==
The shell is smooth and glossy. It is very high and turreted with impressed sutures. The shell shows axial sculpturing of crenulations below the slender ribs. There is often no spiral sculpture; some species show very weak spiral lines.

== Species ==
Species within the genus Hastula include:

- Hastula aciculina (Lamarck, 1822)
- Hastula acumen (Deshayes, 1859)
- Hastula alboflava Bratcher, 1988
- Hastula albula (Menke, 1843)
- Hastula androyensis Bozzetti, 2008
- Hastula anomala (Gray, 1834)
- Hastula anosyana (Bozzetti, 2016)
- Hastula apicina (Deshayes, 1859)
- Hastula apicitincta (G. B. Sowerby III, 1900)
- Hastula bacillus (Deshayes, 1859)
- † Hastula beyrichi (Semper, 1861)
- Hastula casta (Hinds, 1844)
- Hastula celidonota (Melvill & Sykes, 1898)
- Hastula cernohorskyi R. D. Burch, 1965
- Hastula cinerea (Born, 1778)
- Hastula continua (Deshayes, 1859)
- Hastula crossii (Deshayes, 1859)
- Hastula cuspidata (Hinds, 1844)
- Hastula daniae (Aubry, 2008)
- Hastula denizi Rolàn & Gubbioli, 2000
- Hastula diversa (E. A. Smith, 1901)
- Hastula engi Malcolm & Terryn, 2017
- Hastula escondida (Terryn, 2006)
- Hastula exacuminata Sacco, 1891
- † Hastula farinesi (Fontannes, 1881)
- Hastula filmerae (G.B. Sowerby III, 1906)
- Hastula hamamotoi Tsuchida & Tanaka, 1999
- Hastula hastata (Gmelin, 1791)
- Hastula hectica (Linnaeus, 1758)
- † Hastula houstonia (Harris, 1895)
- Hastula imitatrix (Aufenberg & Lee, 1988)
- Hastula inconstans (Hinds, 1844)
- Hastula kiiensis Chino & Terryn, 2019
- Hastula knockeri (E.A. Smith, 1872)
- Hastula lanceata (Linnaeus, 1767)
- Hastula lanterii Terryn, 2018
- Hastula leloeuffi Bouchet, 1982
- Hastula lepida (Hinds, 1844)
- Hastula luctuosa (Hinds, 1844)
- Hastula marqueti (Aubry, 1994)
- Hastula maryleeae Burch, 1965
- Hastula matheroniana (Deshayes, 1859)
- Hastula nana (Deshayes, 1859)
- Hastula natalensis (E. A. Smith, 1903)
- Hastula nimbosa (Hinds, 1844)
- Hastula ogasawarana Chino & Terryn, 2019
- Hastula palauensis Terryn, Gori & Rosado, 2019
- Hastula parva (Baird, 1873)
- Hastula penicillata (Hinds, 1844)
- Hastula philippiana (Deshayes, 1859)
- Hastula pilsbryi (Aubry, 1999)
- † Hastula pseudobasteroti Lozouet, 2017
- Hastula puella (Thiele, 1925)
- Hastula raphanula (Lamarck, 1822)
- Hastula rossacki Sprague, 2000
- Hastula rufopunctata (E.A. Smith, 1877)
- Hastula salleana (Deshayes, 1859)
- Hastula sandrogorii Ryall, Terryn & Rosado, 2017
- Hastula sendersi Terryn & Keppens, 2020
- Hastula solida (Deshayes, 1855)
- Hastula strigilata (Linnaeus, 1758)
- Hastula stylata (Hinds, 1844)
- † Hastula sublaevigata (Grateloup, 1845)
- † Hastula sublaevissima Lozouet, 2017
- Hastula tenuicolorata Bozzetti, 2008
- Hastula tiedemani Burch, 1965
- Hastula tobagoensis (Nowell-Usticke, 1969)
- Hastula trailli (Deshayes, 1859)
- Hastula venus Aubry, 2008
- Hastula verreauxi Deshayes, 1857
- Hastula westralica (Aubry, 1999)
- Hastula willemfaberi Terryn, 2020

Taxon inquirendum

- Hastula colorata Bratcher, 1988

Species brought into synonymy

- Hastula albofuscata Bozzetti, 2008: synonym of Partecosta albofuscata (Bozzetti, 2008)
- Hastula betsyae Burch, 1965: synonym of Hastula penicillata (Hinds, 1844)
- Hastula brazieri (Angas, 1871): synonym of Profunditerebra brazieri (Angas, 1871)
- Hastula caliginosa (Deshayes, 1859): synonym of Strioterebrum caliginosum (Deshayes, 1859)
- Hastula lauta Pease, 1869: synonym of Hastula matheroniana (Deshayes, 1859)
- Hastula lineopunctata (Bozzetti, 2008): synonym of Oxymeris lineopunctata (Bozzetti, 2008)
- Hastula micans Hinds, 1844: synonym of Hastula aciculina (Lamarck, 1822)
- Hastula nitida (Hinds, 1844): synonym of Strioterebrum nitidum (Hinds, 1844)
- Hastula plumbea (Quoy & Gaimard, 1964): synonym of Strioterebrum plumbeum (Quoy & Gaimard, 1833)
- Hastula tenera (Hinds, 1844): synonym of Partecosta tenera (Hinds, 1844)
- Hastula trilineata Bozzetti, 2008 (temporary name): synonym of Partecosta trilineata (Bozzetti, 2008)
