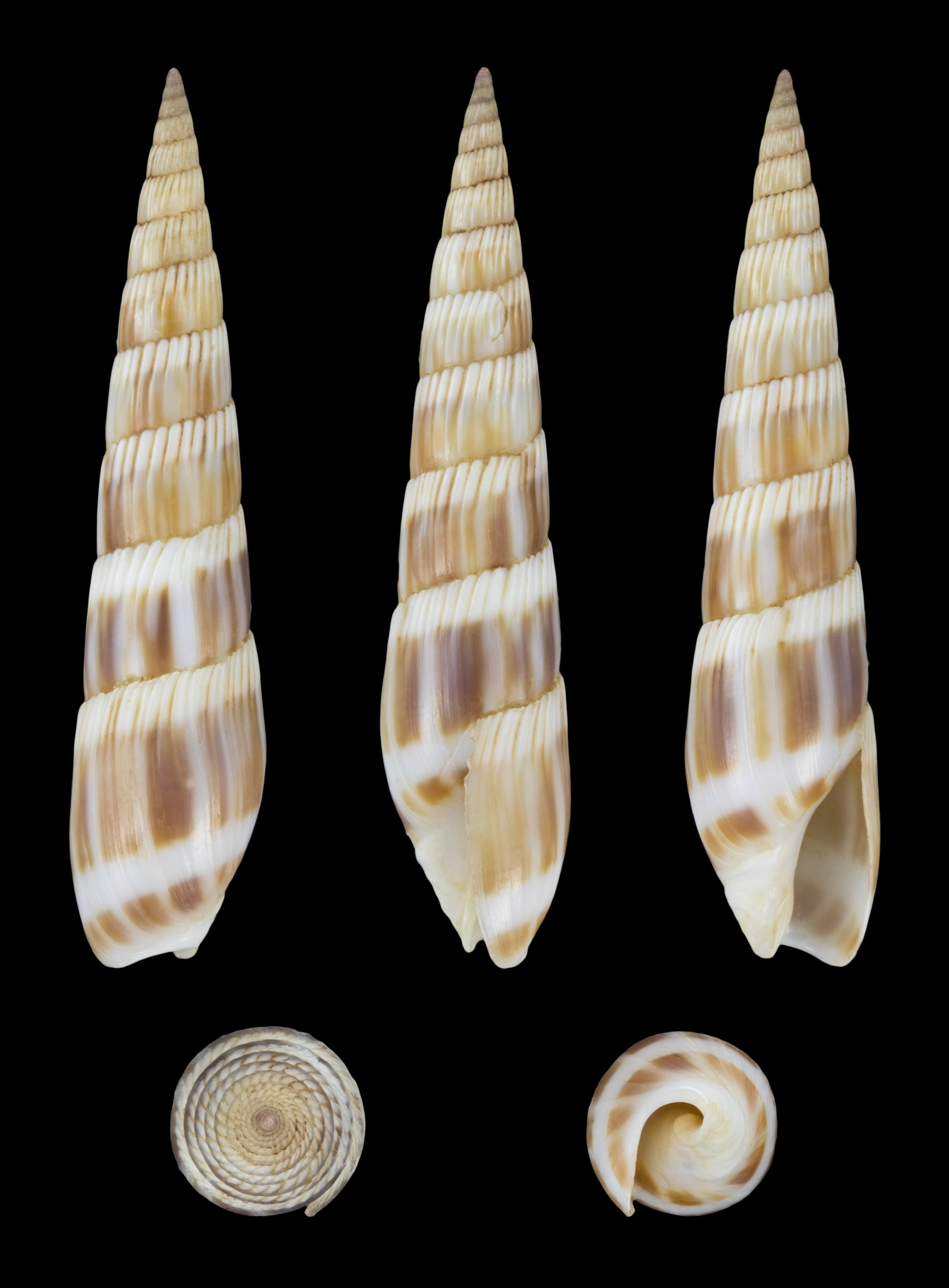

Scientific classification
- Kingdom: Animalia
- Phylum: Mollusca
- Class: Gastropoda
- Subclass: Caenogastropoda
- Order: Neogastropoda
- Family: Terebridae
- Genus: Hastula
- Species: H. inconstans

Binomial name
- Hastula inconstans (Hinds, 1844)

Synonyms
- Impages inconstans (Hinds, 1844); Terebra cinerea Hinds in Sowerby, 1844; Terebra confusa E.A. Smith, 1877; Terebra inconstans Hinds, 1844 (basionym)

= Hastula inconstans =

Species of gastropod

Hastula inconstans is a species of sea snail, a marine gastropod mollusc in the family Terebridae, the auger snails.
