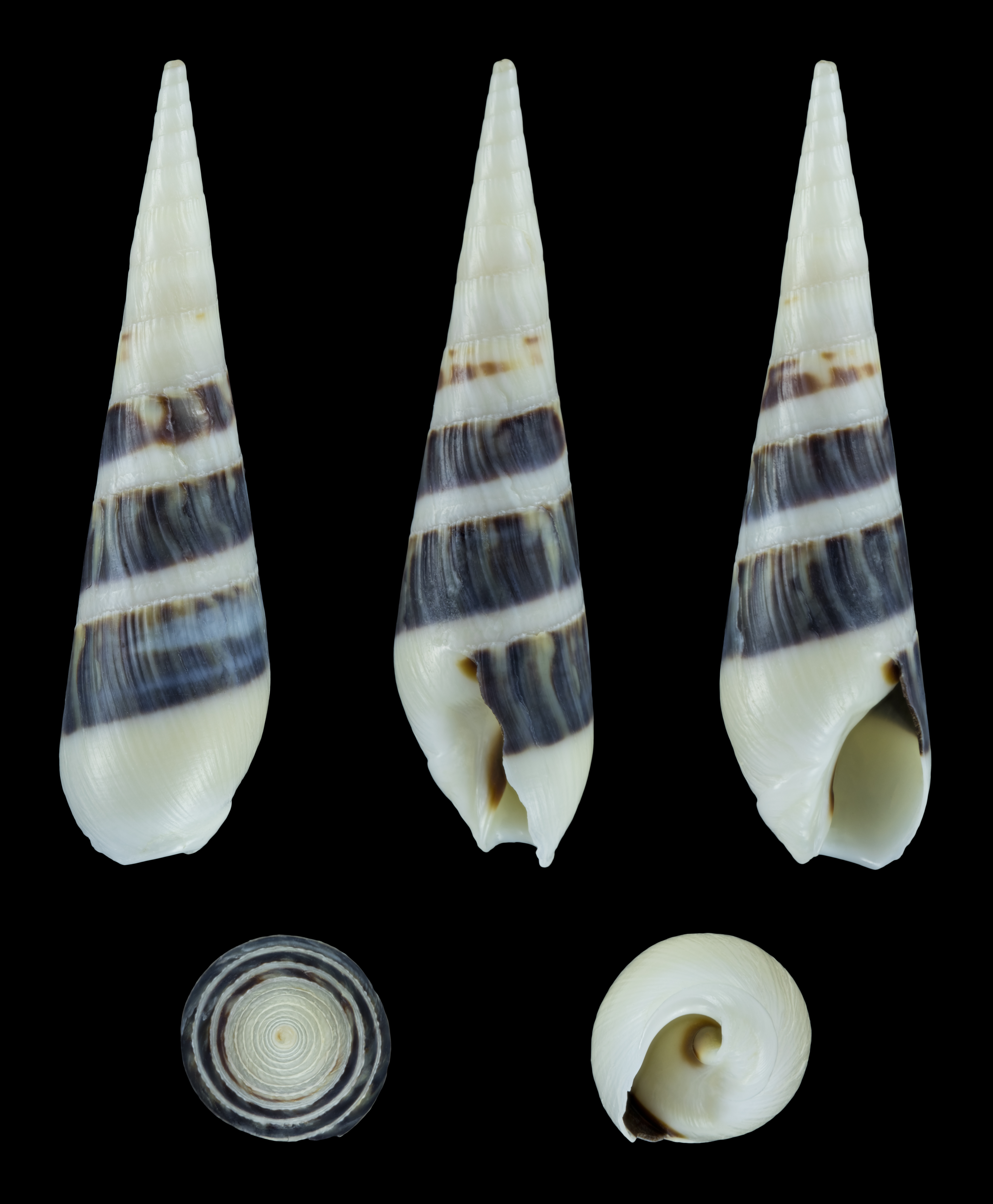
- Apertural view of a shell of Hastula hectica

Scientific classification
- Kingdom: Animalia
- Phylum: Mollusca
- Class: Gastropoda
- Subclass: Caenogastropoda
- Order: Neogastropoda
- Family: Terebridae
- Genus: Hastula
- Species: H. hectica

Binomial name
- Hastula hectica (Linnaeus, 1758)

Synonyms
- Buccinum bifasciatum Dillwyn, 1817; Buccinum edentulum Gmelin, 1791; Buccinum hecticum Linnaeus, 1758; Buccinum niveum Gmelin, 1791; Buccinum terebrale Menke, 1828; Bullia fuscus Gray in Dieffenbach, 1834; Hastula hectica (Linnaeus, 1758); Impages hectica (Linnaeus, 1758); Terebra caerulescens Lamarck, 1822; Terebra caerulescens var. otaitensis Lesson, 1830; Terebra castanea Kiener, 1839; Terebra flammulata Martens, 1880; Terebra hectica Dautzenberg, 1935; Terebra hectica var. alba Dautzenberg, 1935; Terebra hectica var. fusca Dautzenberg, 1935; Terebra hectica var. nimbosa Dautzenberg, 1935; Terebra nimbosa Hinds, 1844

= Hastula hectica =

Species of gastropod

Hastula hectica, common name the sandbeach auger, is a species of sea snail, a marine gastropod mollusc in the family Terebridae, the auger snails.

== Description ==
The length of the shell varies between 30 mm and 80 mm.

== Distribution ==
This species occurs in the Red Sea and the Indo-West Pacific.
