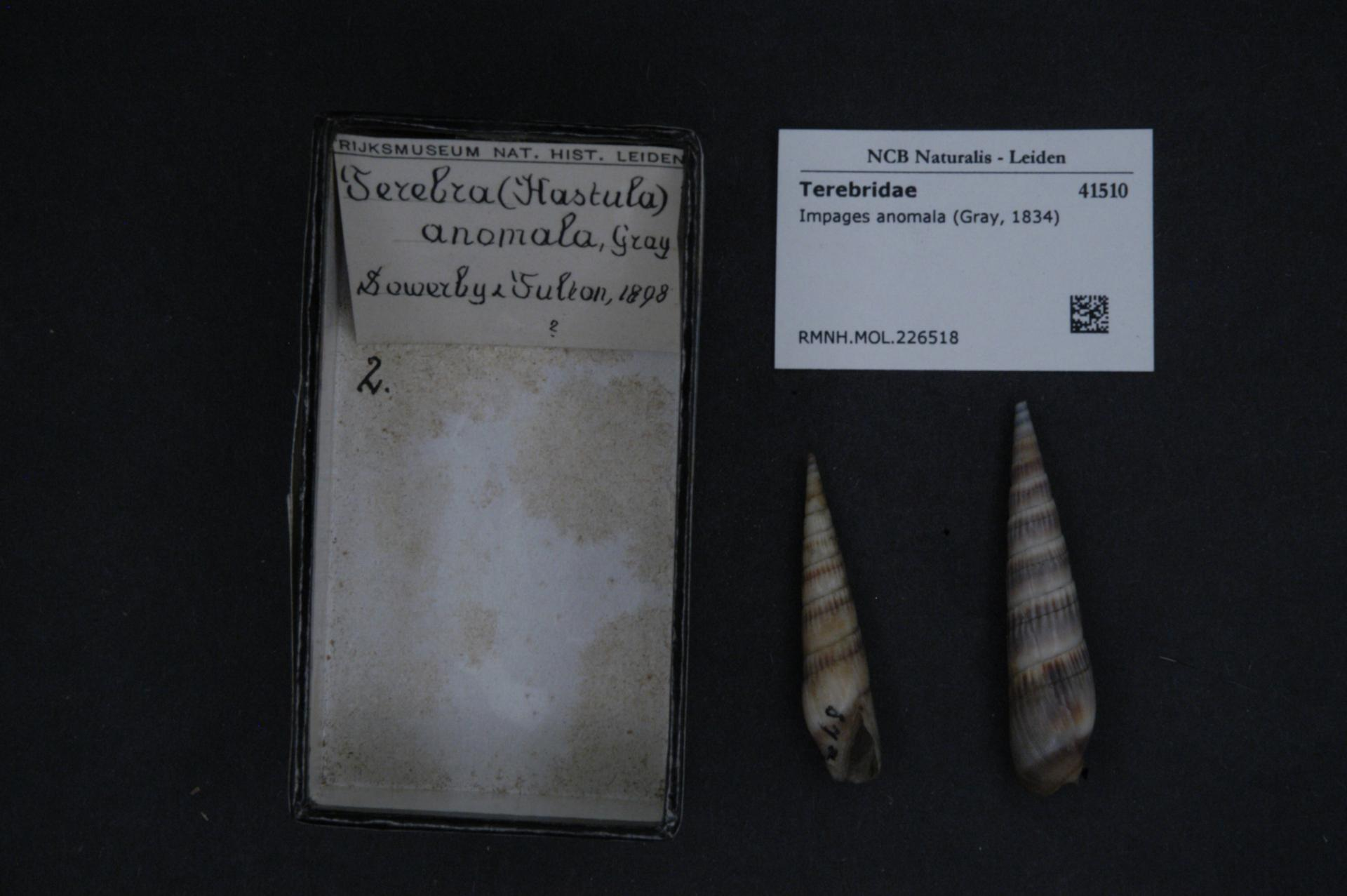
- Shell of Hastula anomala

Scientific classification
- Kingdom: Animalia
- Phylum: Mollusca
- Class: Gastropoda
- Subclass: Caenogastropoda
- Order: Neogastropoda
- Family: Terebridae
- Genus: Hastula
- Species: H. anomala

Binomial name
- Hastula anomala (Gray, 1834)

Synonyms
- Impages anomala (Gray, 1834); Noditerebra anomala (Gray, 1834); Terebra anomala Gray, 1834

= Hastula anomala =

Species of gastropod

Hastula anomala, the anomalous auger, is a species of sea snail, a marine gastropod mollusc in the family Terebridae, the auger snails.

== Description ==
The length of the shell varies between 35 mm and 52 mm.

== Distribution ==
This marine species occurs off Madagascar, the Philippines and Australia.
