= Euterebra =

Scientific classification
- Kingdom: Animalia
- Phylum: Mollusca
- Class: Gastropoda
- Subclass: Caenogastropoda
- Order: Neogastropoda
- Family: Terebridae
- Genus: Euterebra; Cotton & Godfrey, 1932

Type species
- Terebra inconspicua Pritchard & Gatliff, 1902

Synonyms
- Gradaterebra Cotton & Godfrey, 1932; Partecosta Dance & Eames, 1966

Genus of gastropods

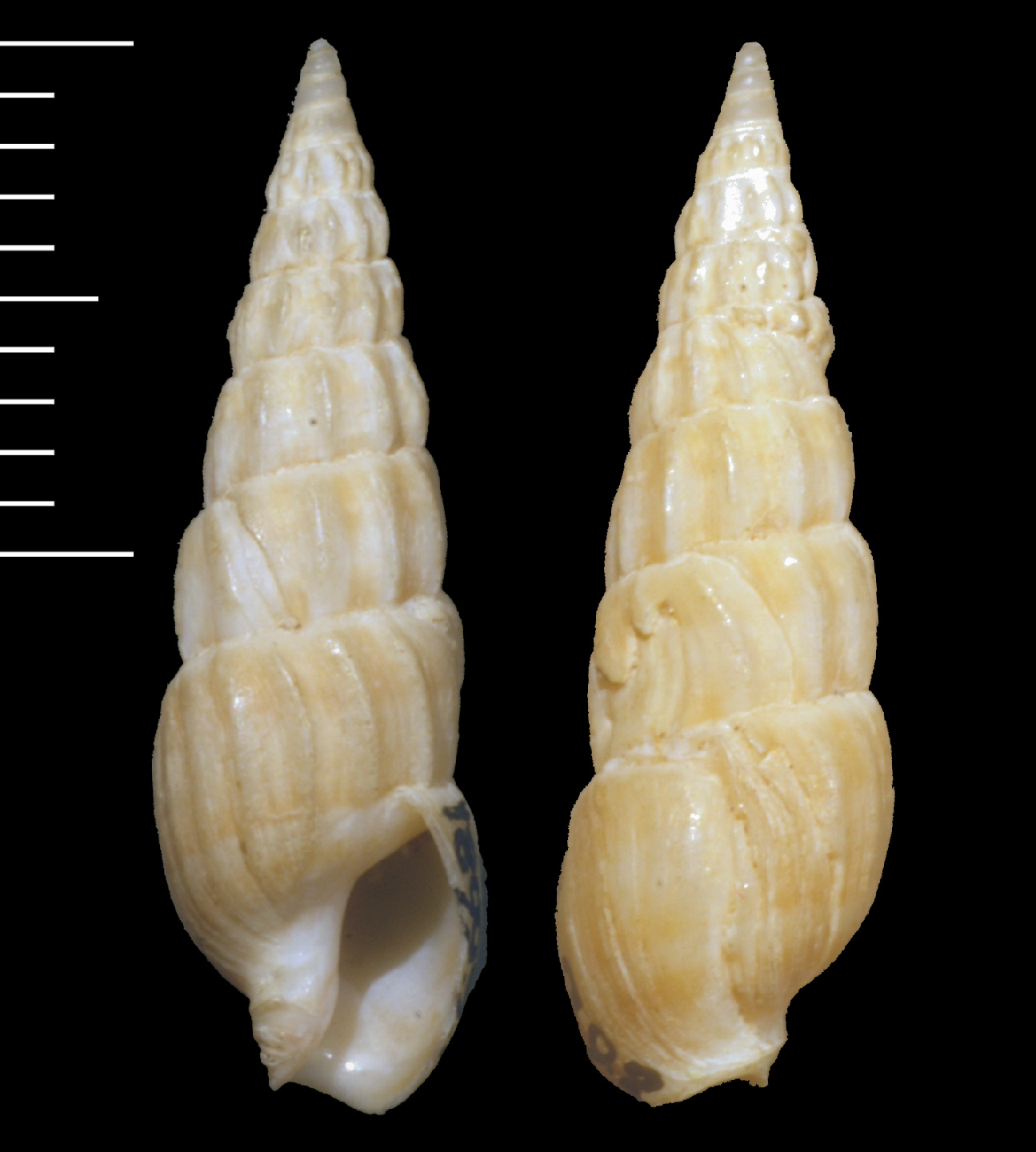
Lecotype of Euterebra lightfooti

Euterebra is a genus of sea snails, marine gastropod mollusks in the family Terebridae, the auger snails.

This genus has become a synonym of Duplicaria Dall, 1908

== Species ==
As of 2020, species within the genus Euterebra include:

- Euterebra mariato Pilsbry & Lowe, 1932 is accepted as Columbellidae_incertae_sedis mariato (Pilsbry & H. N. Lowe, 1932)

Species brought into synonymy

- Euterebra angelli (J. Gibson-Smith & W. Gibson-Smith, 1984): synonym of Neoterebra angelli (J. Gibson-Smith & W. Gibson-Smith, 1984)
- Euterebra assecla (Iredale, 1924): synonym of Gradaterebra assecla (Iredale, 1924)
- Euterebra capensis (E. A. Smith, 1873): synonym of Duplicaria capensis (E. A. Smith, 1873)
- Euterebra fuscobasis (E.A. Smith, 1877): synonym of Partecosta fuscobasis (E. A. Smith, 1877)
- Euterebra fuscocincta (E.A. Smith, 1877): synonym of Partecosta fuscocincta (E. A. Smith, 1877)
- Euterebra fuscolutea Bozzetti, 2008: synonym of Partecosta fuscolutea (Bozzetti, 2008)
- Euterebra herosae Terryn & Rosado, 2011: synonym of Partecosta herosae (Terryn & Rosado, 2011)
- Euterebra kowiensis (Turton, 1932): synonym of Gradaterebra kowiensis (W. H. Turton, 1932)
- Euterebra lightfooti (E.A. Smith, 1899): synonym of Gradaterebra lightfooti (E. A. Smith, 1899)
- Euterebra macandrewii (E.A. Smith, 1877): synonym of Partecosta macandrewii (E. A. Smith, 1877)
- Euterebra padangensis (Thiele, 1925): synonym of Partecosta padangensis (Thiele, 1925)
- Euterebra planecosta (Barnard, 1958): synonym of Gradaterebra planecosta (Barnard, 1958)
- Euterebra puncturosa (Berry, 1959): synonym of Neoterebra puncturosa (Berry, 1959)
- Euterebra riosi (Bratcher & Cernohorsky, 1985): synonym of Neoterebra riosi (Bratcher & Cernohorsky, 1985)
- Euterebra sandrinae (Aubry, 2008): synonym of Partecosta sandrinae (Aubry, 2008)
- Euterebra scalariformis (Cotton & Godfrey, 1932): synonym of Gradaterebra scalariformis (Cotton & Godfrey, 1932)
- Euterebra severa (Melvill, 1897): synonym of Gradaterebra severa (Melvill, 1897)
- Euterebra tantilla (E.A. Smith, 1873): synonym of Partecosta tantilla (E. A. Smith, 1873)
- Euterebra taylori (Reeve, 1860): synonym of Gradaterebra taylori (Reeve, 1860)
- Euterebra tristis (Deshayes, 1859): synonym of Duplicaria tristis (Deshayes, 1859)
