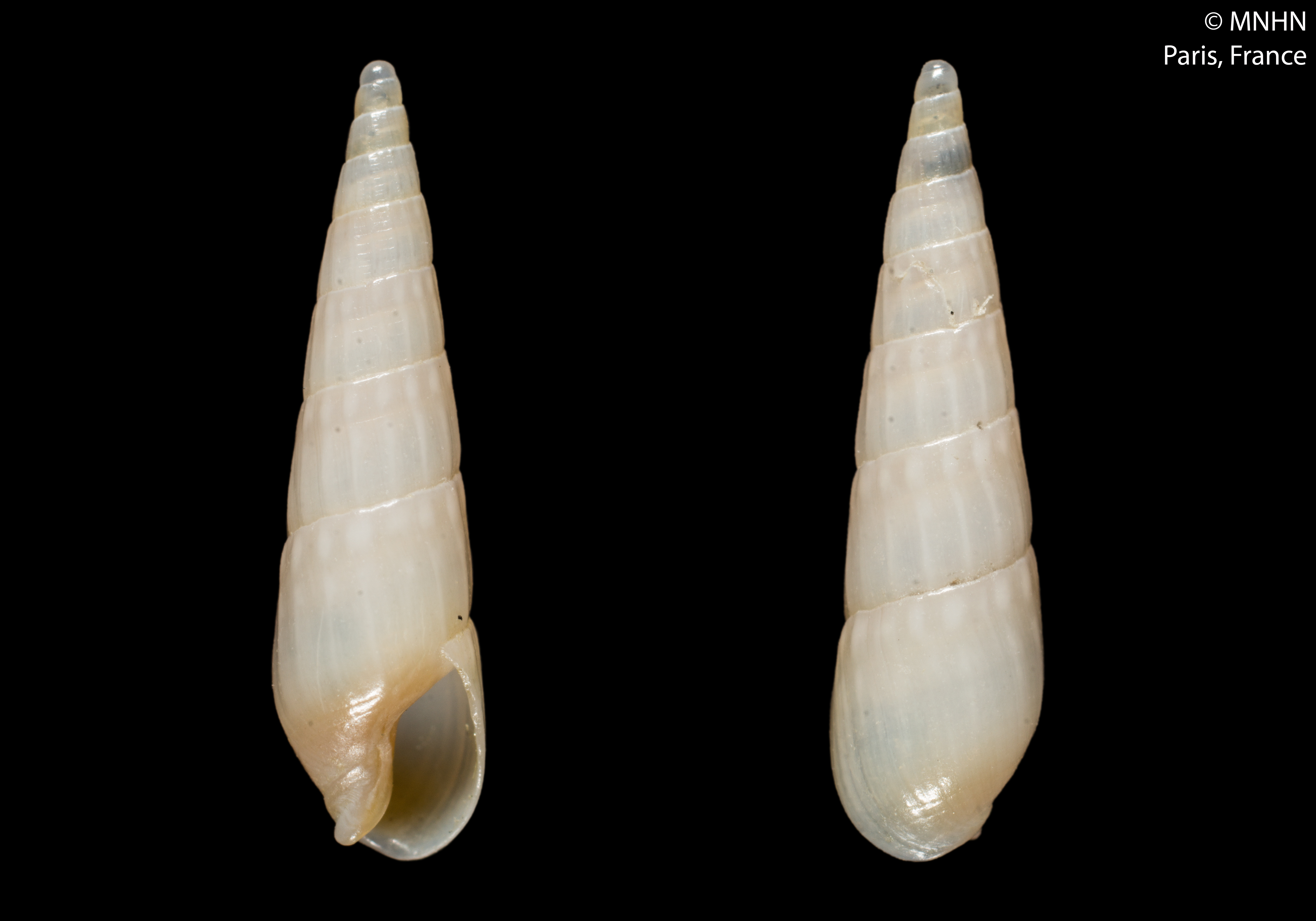
- Shell of Partecosta albofuscata (holotype at MNHN, Paris)

Scientific classification
- Kingdom: Animalia
- Phylum: Mollusca
- Class: Gastropoda
- Subclass: Caenogastropoda
- Order: Neogastropoda
- Family: Terebridae
- Genus: Partecosta
- Species: P. albofuscata

Binomial name
- Partecosta albofuscata (Bozzetti, 2008)

Synonyms
- Duplicaria albofuscata (Bozzetti, 2008); Hastula albofuscata Bozzetti, 2008 (original combination)

= Partecosta albofuscata =

Species of gastropod

Partecosta albofuscata is a species of sea snail, a marine gastropod mollusc in the family Terebridae, the auger snails.
