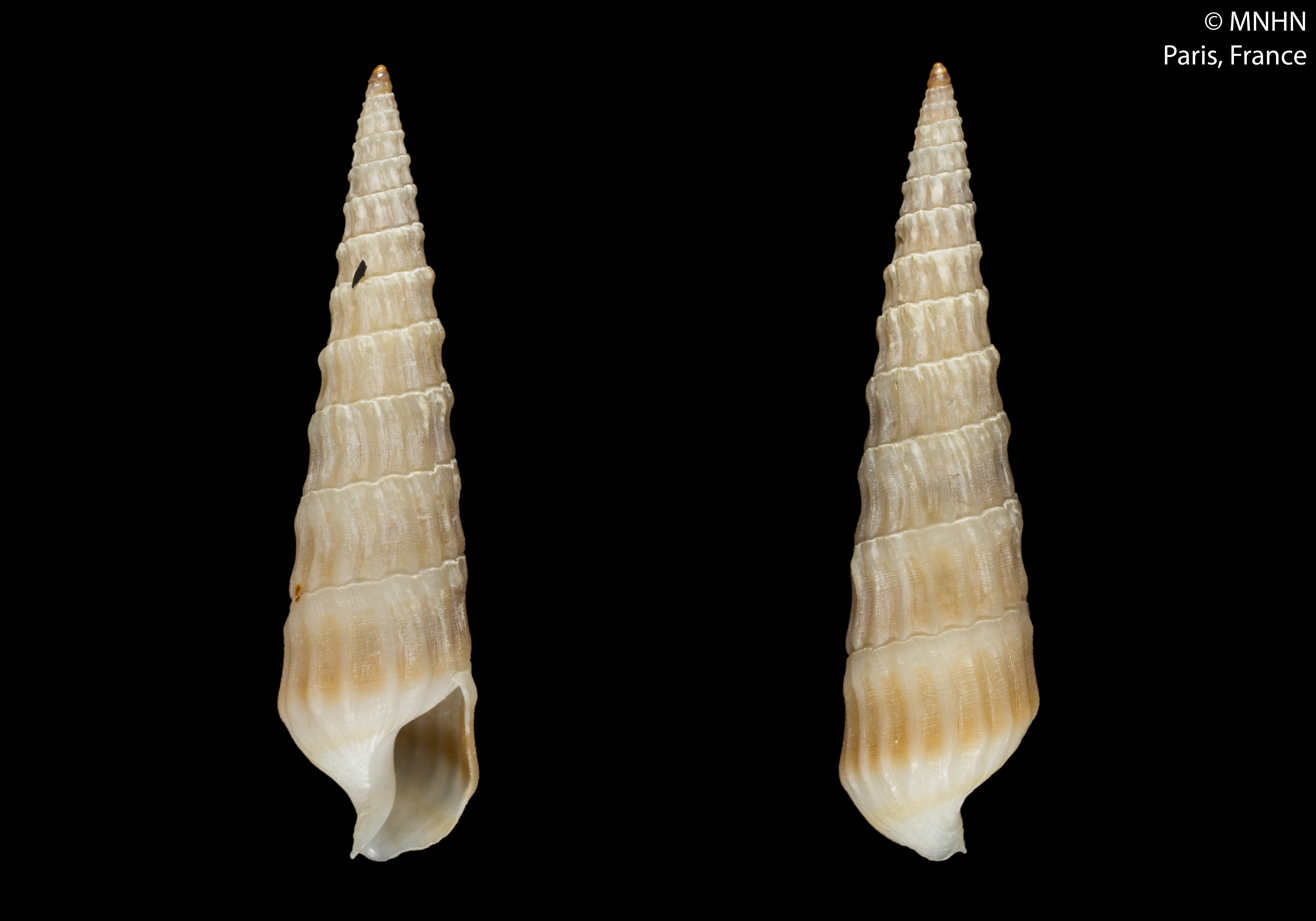
- Shell of Pellifronia brianhayesi (holotype at MNHN, Paris)

Scientific classification
- Kingdom: Animalia
- Phylum: Mollusca
- Class: Gastropoda
- Subclass: Caenogastropoda
- Order: Neogastropoda
- Family: Terebridae
- Genus: Pellifronia
- Species: P. brianhayesi

Binomial name
- Pellifronia brianhayesi (Terryn & Sprague, 2008)

Synonyms
- Terebra brianhayesi Terryn & Sprague, 2008 (original combination)

= Pellifronia brianhayesi =

Species of gastropod

Pellifronia brianhayesi is a species of sea snail, a marine gastropod mollusk in the family Terebridae, the auger snails.

== Description ==
The length and the height of the shell attains 22.6 mm.

== Distribution ==
This marine species occurs off Southern Mozambique.
