= Gradaterebra sorrentensis =

Scientific classification
- Kingdom: Animalia
- Phylum: Mollusca
- Class: Gastropoda
- Subclass: Caenogastropoda
- Order: Neogastropoda
- Superfamily: Conoidea
- Family: Terebridae
- Genus: Gradaterebra
- Species: G. sorrentensis

Binomial name
- Gradaterebra sorrentensis (Aubry, 1999)

Synonyms
- Strioterebrum sorrentense (Aubry, 1999); Terebra sorrentensis Aubry, 1999 (original combination)

Species of gastropod

Gradaterebra sorrentensis is a species of sea snail, a marine gastropod mollusk in the family Terebridae, the auger snails.

== Description ==
The size of an adult shell varies between 6 mm and 8 mm.

== Distribution ==
This marine species can be found off Western Australia.
