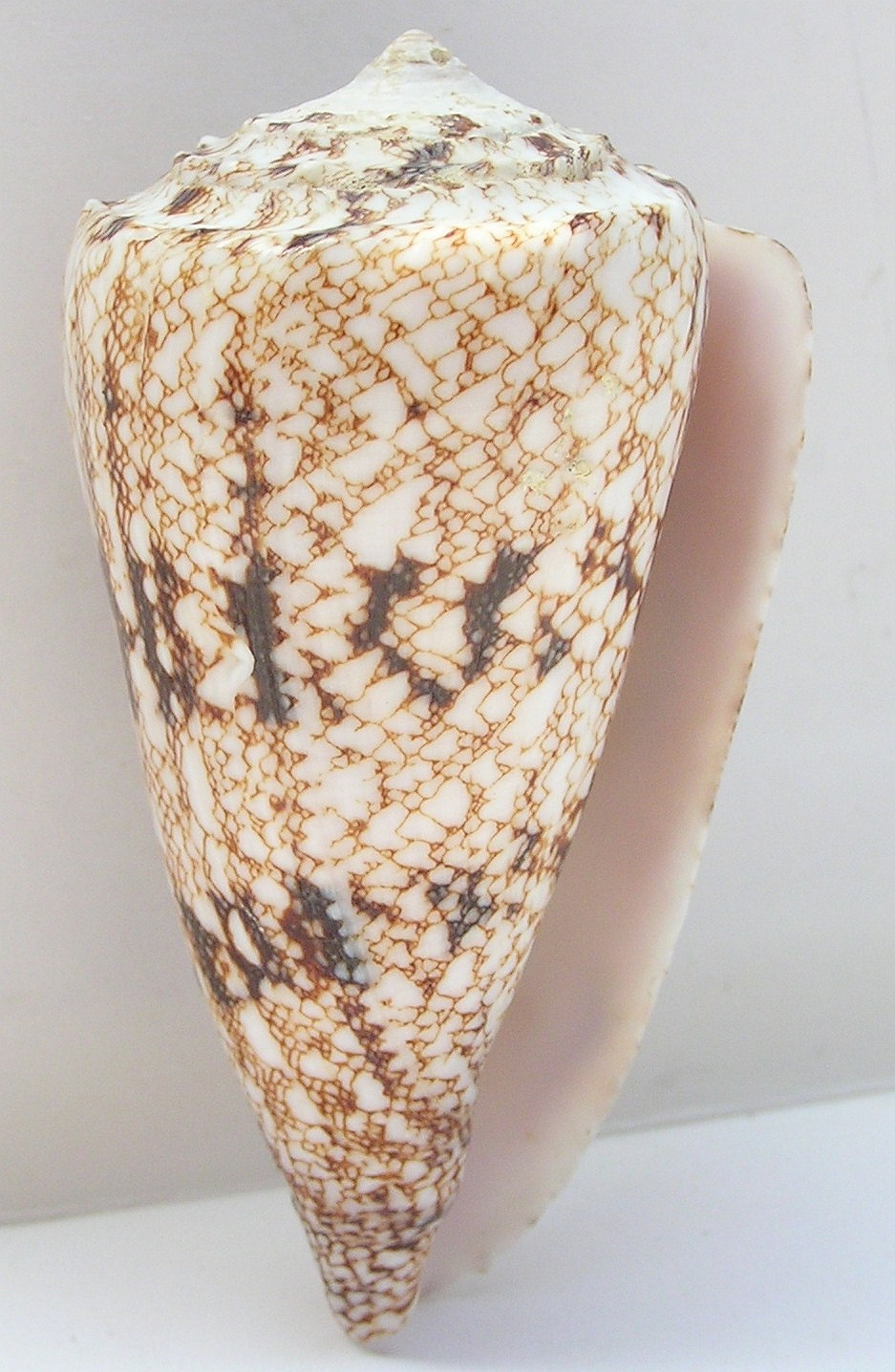
- Apertural view of Conus araneosus

Conservation status
- Least Concern (IUCN 3.1)

Scientific classification
- Kingdom: Animalia
- Phylum: Mollusca
- Class: Gastropoda
- Subclass: Caenogastropoda
- Order: Neogastropoda
- Superfamily: Conoidea
- Family: Conidae
- Genus: Conus
- Species: C. araneosus

Binomial name
- Conus araneosus sensu Lightfoot, 1786

Synonyms
- Conus (Conus) araneosus [Lightfoot], 1786 accepted, alternate representation; Conus arachnoideus Gmelin, 1791; Conus arachnoideus bizonata (f) Crosse, H., 1858; Conus araneosus Hwass in Bruguière, 1792; Conus cassis "Meuschen, F.C." Dillwyn, L.W., 1817; Conus monstrosus Küster, 1838; Conus peplum G. B. Sowerby II, 1857; Conus reticulatus Perry, 1811; Cucullus arenosus Röding, 1798; Cucullus stercusmuscarum Röding, 1798

= Conus araneosus =

Species of sea snail

Conus araneosus, common name the cobweb cone, is a species of sea snail, a marine gastropod mollusk in the family Conidae, the cone snails, cone shells or cones.

Like all species within the genus Conus, these snails are predatory and venomous. They are capable of stinging humans, therefore live ones should be handled carefully or not at all.

Subspecies

- Conus araneosus araneosus [Lightfoot], 1786
- Conus araneosus nicobaricus Hwass in Bruguière, 1792

== Description ==
The size of an adult shell varies between 48 mm and 100mm. The shell is very closely reticulated with white and light chestnut, the white spots crowded and irregular in size, the chestnut lines forming two interrupted, irregular bands.

== Distribution ==
This marine species occurs in the Indian Ocean off Tanzania, in the Indian Ocean off India and Sri Lanka and in the Pacific Ocean off the Philippines and Indonesia.
