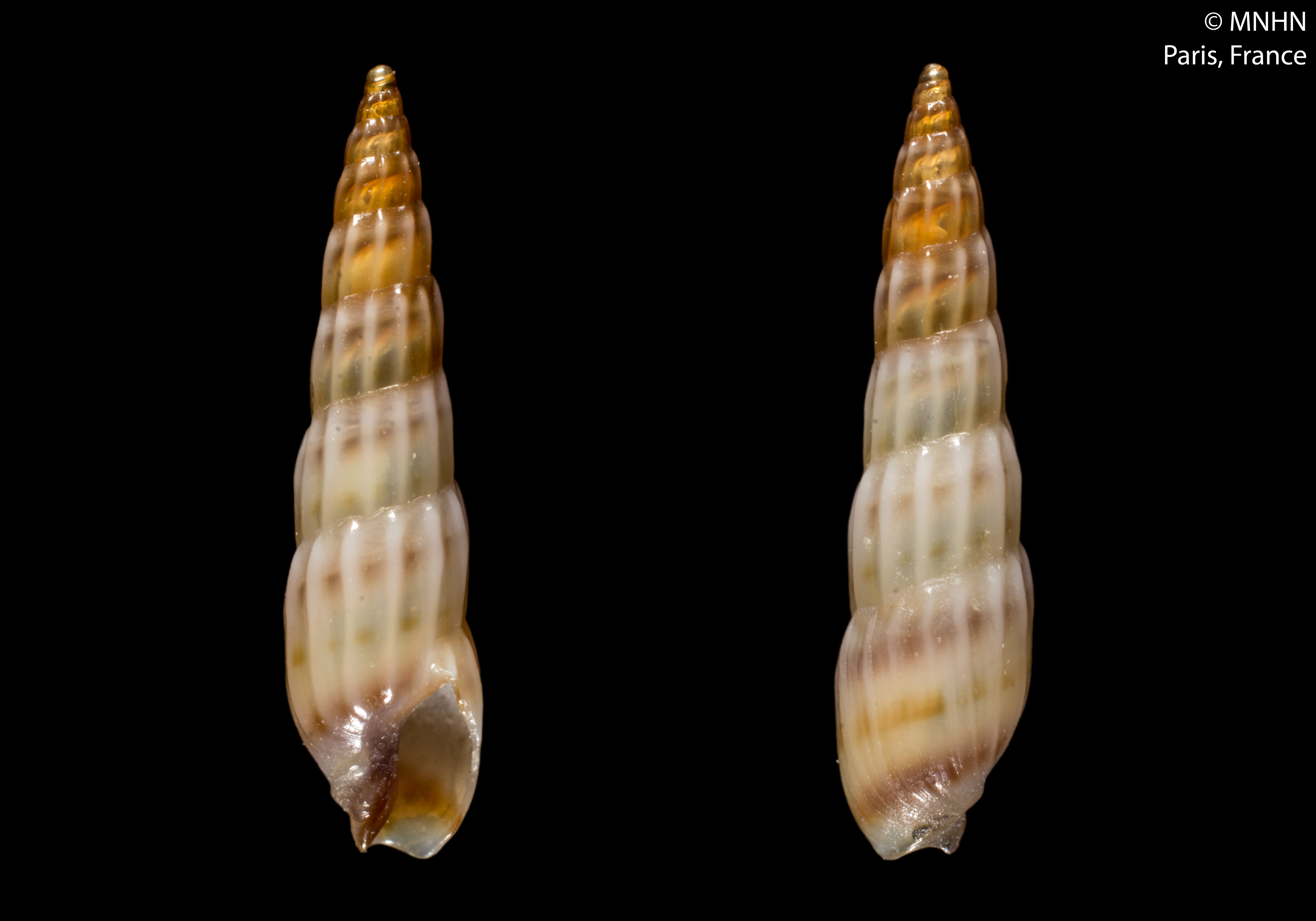

Scientific classification
- Kingdom: Animalia
- Phylum: Mollusca
- Class: Gastropoda
- Subclass: Caenogastropoda
- Order: Neogastropoda
- Family: Terebridae
- Genus: Partecosta
- Species: P. trilineata

Binomial name
- Partecosta trilineata (Bozzetti, 2008)

Synonyms
- Hastula trilineata (Bozzetti, 2008); Impages trilineata Bozzetti, 2008 (original combination)

= Partecosta trilineata =

Species of gastropod

Partecosta trilineata is a species of sea snail, a marine gastropod mollusk in the family Terebridae, the auger snails.

== Distribution ==
This marine species occurs off Southern Madagascar.
