= Gradaterebra easmithi =

Scientific classification
- Kingdom: Animalia
- Phylum: Mollusca
- Class: Gastropoda
- Subclass: Caenogastropoda
- Order: Neogastropoda
- Family: Terebridae
- Genus: Gradaterebra
- Species: G. easmithi

Binomial name
- Gradaterebra easmithi (Aubry, 1999)

Synonyms
- Duplicaria easmithi (Aubry, 1999); Terebra easmithi Aubry, 1999 (original combination)

Species of gastropod

Gradaterebra easmithi is a species of sea snail, a marine gastropod mollusc in the family Terebridae, the auger snails.
