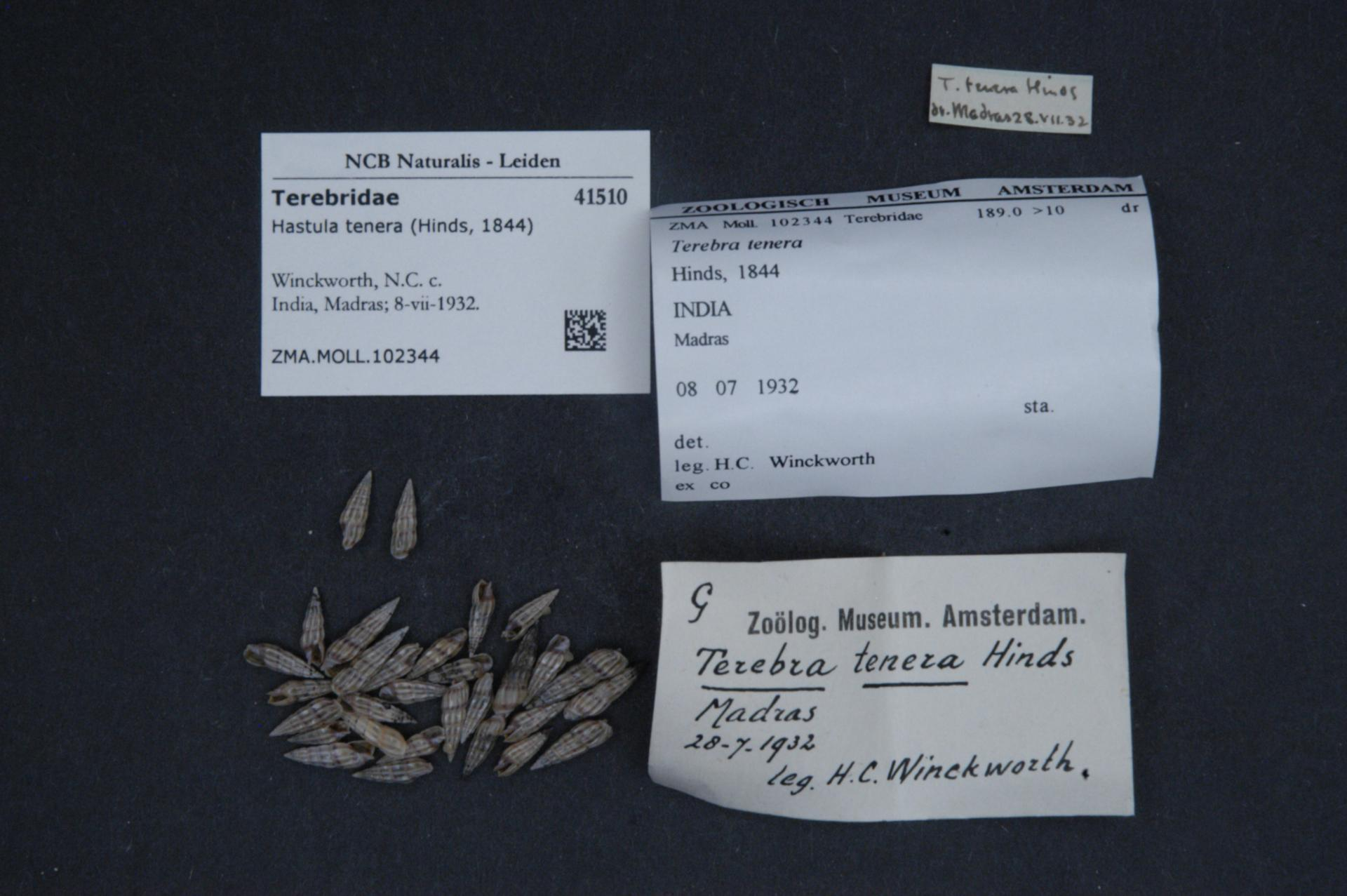

Scientific classification
- Kingdom: Animalia
- Phylum: Mollusca
- Class: Gastropoda
- Subclass: Caenogastropoda
- Order: Neogastropoda
- Family: Terebridae
- Genus: Partecosta
- Species: P. tenera

Binomial name
- Partecosta tenera (Hinds, 1844)

Synonyms
- Hastula tenera (Hinds, 1844); Terebra tenera Hinds, 1844

= Partecosta tenera =

Species of gastropod

Partecosta tenera is a species of sea snail, a marine gastropod mollusk in the family Terebridae, the auger snails.

== Distribution ==
This marine species occurs in the Malacca Strait, Sri Lanka.
