= Gradaterebra ninfae =

Scientific classification
- Kingdom: Animalia
- Phylum: Mollusca
- Class: Gastropoda
- Subclass: Caenogastropoda
- Order: Neogastropoda
- Family: Terebridae
- Genus: Gradaterebra
- Species: G. ninfae

Binomial name
- Gradaterebra ninfae (Campbell, 1961)

Synonyms
- Terebra ninfae G. B. Campbell, 1961 (original combination)

Species of gastropod

Gradaterebra ninfae is a species of sea snail, a marine gastropod mollusk in the family Terebridae, the auger snails.
