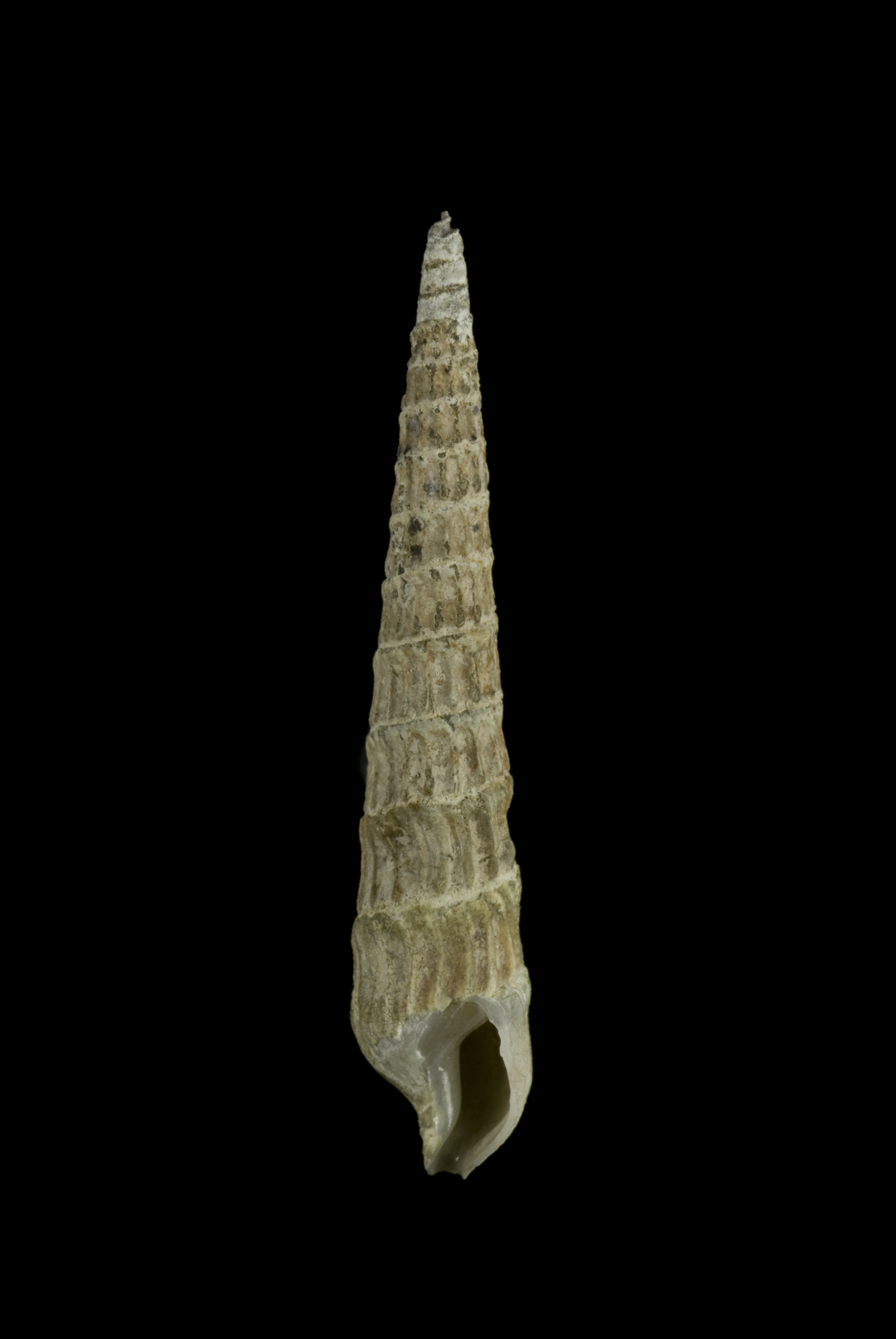
- Shell of Pellifronia jungi (specimen at MNHN, Paris)

Scientific classification
- Kingdom: Animalia
- Phylum: Mollusca
- Class: Gastropoda
- Subclass: Caenogastropoda
- Order: Neogastropoda
- Family: Terebridae
- Genus: Pellifronia
- Species: P. jungi

Binomial name
- Pellifronia jungi (K.-Y. Lai, 2001)

Synonyms
- Terebra jungi K.-Y. Lai, 2001 (original combination)

= Pellifronia jungi =

Species of gastropod

Pellifronia jungi is a species of sea snail, a marine gastropod mollusk in the family Terebridae, the auger snails.

== Description ==
The size of an adult shell varies between 30 mm and 63 mm.

== Distribution ==
This species occurs in the East China Sea and in the Pacific Ocean off the Solomons and Papua New Guinea.
