= Partecosta nassoides =

Scientific classification
- Kingdom: Animalia
- Phylum: Mollusca
- Class: Gastropoda
- Subclass: Caenogastropoda
- Order: Neogastropoda
- Family: Terebridae
- Genus: Partecosta
- Species: P. nassoides

Binomial name
- Partecosta nassoides (Hinds, 1844)

Synonyms
- Impages nassoides (Hinds, 1844); Terebra nassoides Hinds, 1844 (original combination)

Species of gastropod

Partecosta nassoides is a species of sea snail, a marine gastropod mollusk in the family Terebridae, the auger snails.
