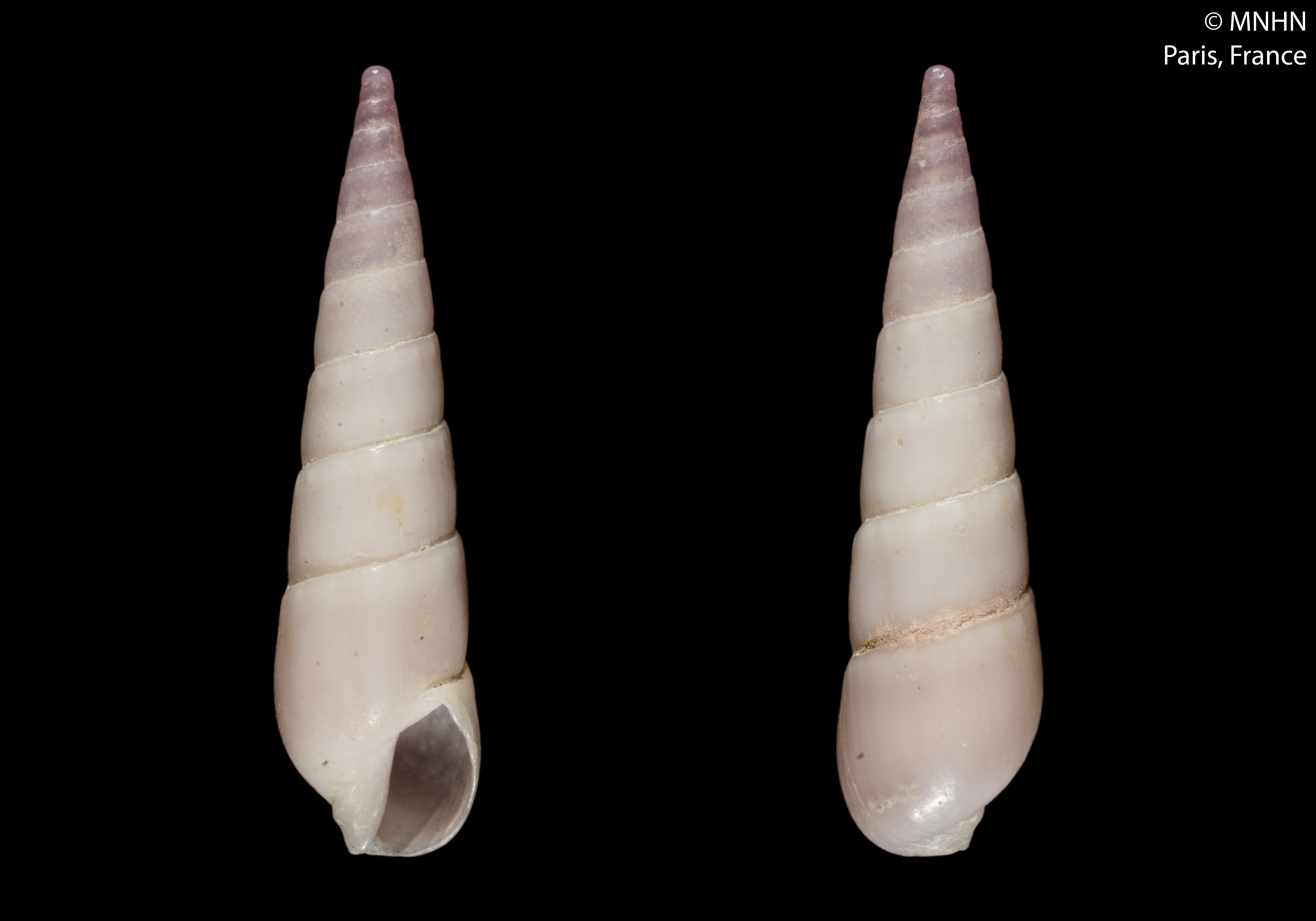
- Shell of Partecosta veliae (holotype at MNHN, Paris)

Scientific classification
- Kingdom: Animalia
- Phylum: Mollusca
- Class: Gastropoda
- Subclass: Caenogastropoda
- Order: Neogastropoda
- Family: Terebridae
- Genus: Partecosta
- Species: P. veliae

Binomial name
- Partecosta veliae (Aubry, 1991)

Synonyms
- Terebra veliae Aubry, 1991 (original combination)

= Partecosta veliae =

Species of gastropod

Partecosta veliae is a species of sea snail, a marine gastropod mollusk in the family Terebridae, the auger snails.

== Description ==
Original description: "A small fragile ivory-white coloured shell, with protoconch and the first four and a half whorls of a pale violet colour, this last being a fundamental feature. The teleoconch consists of nine whorls, and the protoconch of one and a half. The whorls are completely smooth with a total absence of spiral or axial sculpture. The columella is smooth and the aperture moderately square. The suture is deep."

== Distribution ==
Locus typicus: "Margaret River, South-West Australia."
