= Partecosta macleani =

Scientific classification
- Kingdom: Animalia
- Phylum: Mollusca
- Class: Gastropoda
- Subclass: Caenogastropoda
- Order: Neogastropoda
- Family: Terebridae
- Genus: Partecosta
- Species: P. macleani

Binomial name
- Partecosta macleani (Bratcher, 1988)

Synonyms
- Pristiterebra macleani (Bratcher, 1988); Terebra macleani Bratcher, 1988 (original combination)

Species of gastropod

Partecosta macleani is a species of sea snail, a marine gastropod mollusk in the family Terebridae, the auger snails.

== Distribution ==
This marine species occurs off the Eastern Cape, South Africa.
