= Partecosta fuscocincta =

Scientific classification
- Kingdom: Animalia
- Phylum: Mollusca
- Class: Gastropoda
- Subclass: Caenogastropoda
- Order: Neogastropoda
- Family: Terebridae
- Genus: Partecosta
- Species: P. fuscocincta

Binomial name
- Partecosta fuscocincta (E.A. Smith, 1877)

Synonyms
- Euterebra fuscocincta (E. A. Smith, 1877); Terebra (Myurella) fuscocincta E. A. Smith, 1877 (basionym); Terebra fuscocincta E.A Smith, 1877 (original combination)

Species of gastropod

Partecosta fuscocincta is a species of sea snail, a marine gastropod mollusk in the family Terebridae, the auger snails.
