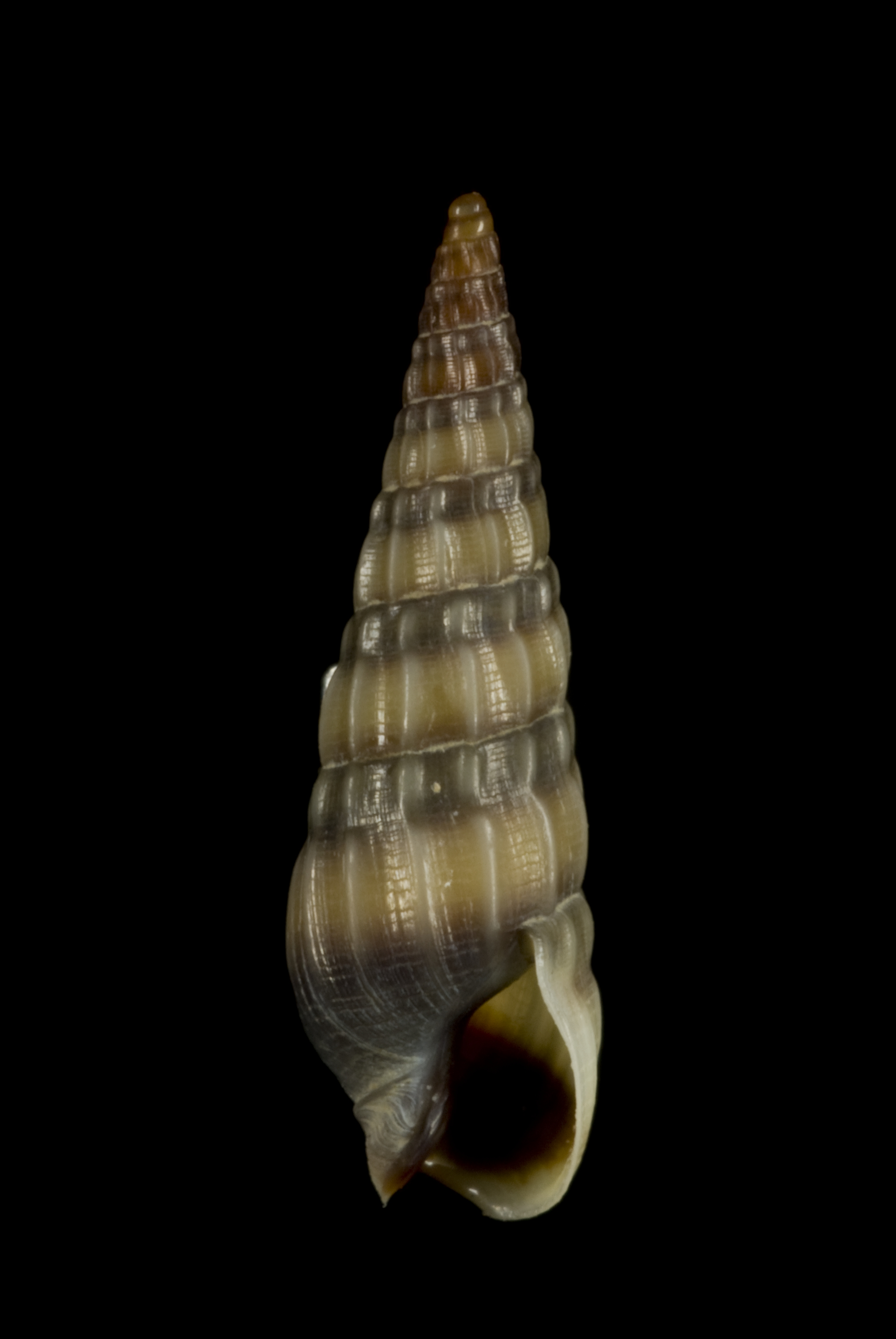

Scientific classification
- Kingdom: Animalia
- Phylum: Mollusca
- Class: Gastropoda
- Subclass: Caenogastropoda
- Order: Neogastropoda
- Superfamily: Conoidea
- Family: Terebridae
- Genus: Partecosta
- Species: P. sandrinae

Binomial name
- Partecosta sandrinae (Aubry, 2008)

Synonyms
- Euterebra sandrinae (Aubry, 2008); Terebra sandrinae Aubry, 2008 (original combination)

= Partecosta sandrinae =

Species of gastropod

Partecosta sandrinae is a species of sea snail, a marine gastropod mollusc in the family Terebridae, the auger snails.

== Distribution ==
This marine species occurs off Mozambique.
