= Gradaterebra taylori =

Scientific classification
- Kingdom: Animalia
- Phylum: Mollusca
- Class: Gastropoda
- Subclass: Caenogastropoda
- Order: Neogastropoda
- Family: Terebridae
- Genus: Gradaterebra
- Species: G. taylori

Binomial name
- Gradaterebra taylori (Reeve, 1860)

Synonyms
- Duplicaria taylori (Reeve, 1860); Euterebra taylori (Reeve, 1860); Terebra taylori Reeve, 1860

Species of gastropod

Gradaterebra taylori is a species of sea snail, a marine gastropod mollusc in the family Terebridae, the auger snails.
