= Partecosta padangensis =

Scientific classification
- Kingdom: Animalia
- Phylum: Mollusca
- Class: Gastropoda
- Subclass: Caenogastropoda
- Order: Neogastropoda
- Family: Terebridae
- Genus: Partecosta
- Species: P. padangensis

Binomial name
- Partecosta padangensis (Thiele, 1925)

Synonyms
- Euterebra padangensis (Thiele, 1925); Terebra durgella Ray, 1968; Terebra padangensis Thiele, 1925

Species of gastropod

Partecosta padangensis is a species of sea snail, a marine gastropod mollusk in the family Terebridae, the auger snails.
