= Gradaterebra scalariformis =

Scientific classification
- Kingdom: Animalia
- Phylum: Mollusca
- Class: Gastropoda
- Subclass: Caenogastropoda
- Order: Neogastropoda
- Family: Terebridae
- Genus: Gradaterebra
- Species: G. scalariformis

Binomial name
- Gradaterebra scalariformis (Cotton & Godfrey, 1932)

Synonyms
- Euterebra scalariformis (Cotton & Godfrey, 1932); Terebra scalariformis (Cotton & Godfrey, 1932)

Species of gastropod

Gradaterebra scalariformis is a species of sea snail, a marine gastropod mollusk in the family Terebridae, the auger snails.
