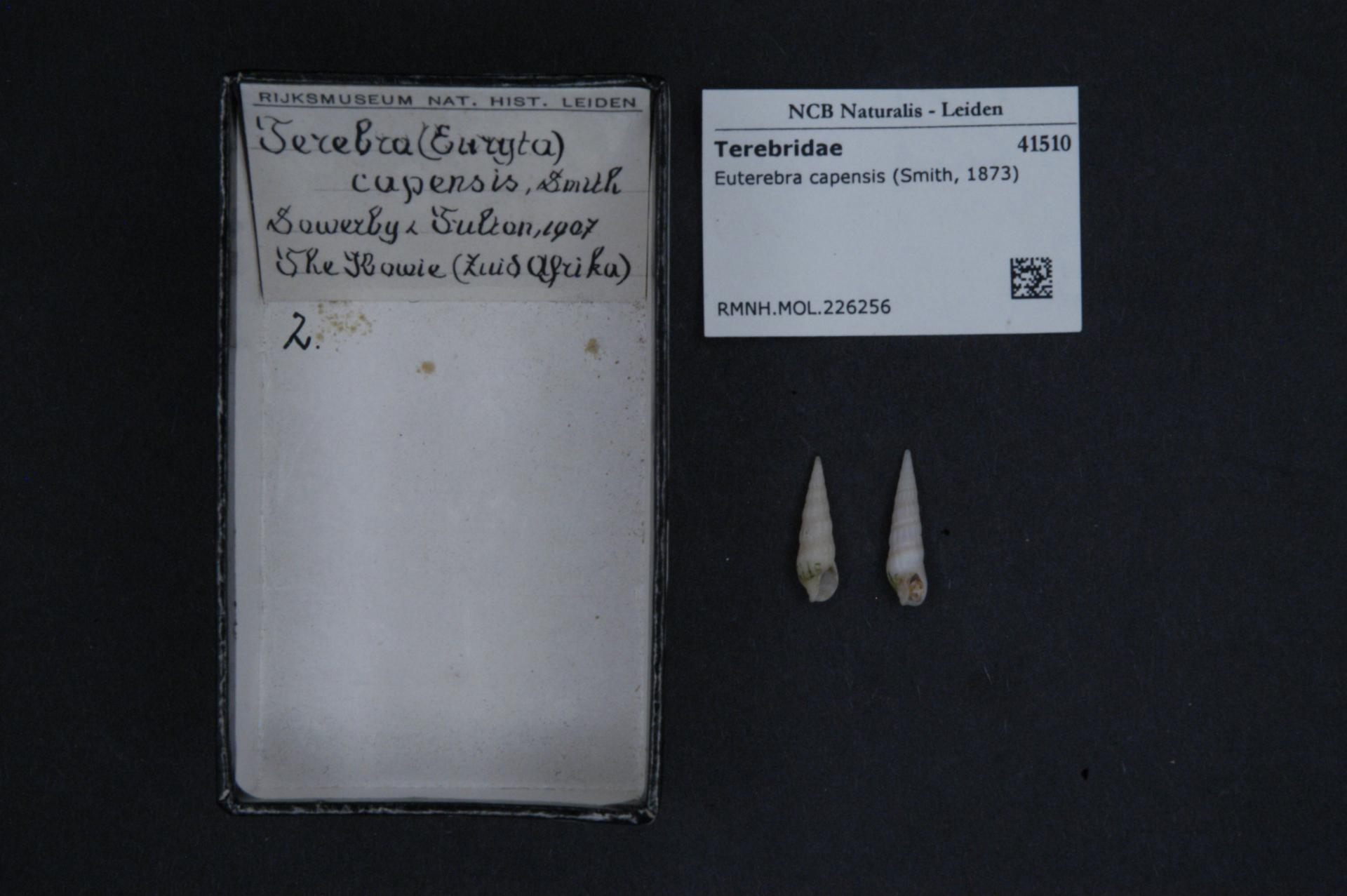

Scientific classification
- Kingdom: Animalia
- Phylum: Mollusca
- Class: Gastropoda
- Subclass: Caenogastropoda
- Order: Neogastropoda
- Superfamily: Conoidea
- Family: Terebridae
- Genus: Gradaterebra
- Species: G. capensis

Binomial name
- Gradaterebra capensis (E. A. Smith, 1873)

Synonyms
- Duplicaria capensis (E. A. Smith, 1873); Euterebra capensis (E. A. Smith, 1873); Myurella capensis E.A. Smith, 1873; Terebra capensis (E.A Smith, 1873)

= Gradaterebra capensis =

Species of gastropod

Gradaterebra capensis is a species of sea snail, a marine gastropod mollusk in the family Terebridae, the auger snails.
