= Gradaterebra planecosta =

Scientific classification
- Kingdom: Animalia
- Phylum: Mollusca
- Class: Gastropoda
- Subclass: Caenogastropoda
- Order: Neogastropoda
- Family: Terebridae
- Genus: Gradaterebra
- Species: G. planecosta

Binomial name
- Gradaterebra planecosta (Barnard, 1958)

Synonyms
- Euterebra planecosta (Barnard, 1958); Terebra planecosta Barnard, 1958 (original combination)

Species of gastropod

Gradaterebra planecosta is a species of sea snail, a marine gastropod mollusc in the family Terebridae, the auger snails.
