= Gradaterebra =

Scientific classification
- Kingdom: Animalia
- Phylum: Mollusca
- Class: Gastropoda
- Subclass: Caenogastropoda
- Order: Neogastropoda
- Superfamily: Conoidea
- Family: Terebridae
- Genus: Gradaterebra; Cotton & Godfrey, 1932

Type species
- Gradaterebra scalariformis Cotton & Godfrey, 1932

Species
- See text

Genus of gastropods

Gradaterebra is a genus of sea snails, marine gastropod mollusks in the family Terebridae, the auger snails.

== Species ==
- Gradaterebra assecla (Iredale, 1924)
- Gradaterebra capensis (E. A. Smith, 1873)
- Gradaterebra easmithi (Aubry, 1999)
- Gradaterebra kowiensis (W. H. Turton, 1932)
- Gradaterebra lightfooti (E. A. Smith, 1899)
- Gradaterebra ninfae (G. B. Campbell, 1961)
- Gradaterebra pilsbryi (Aubry, 1999)
- Gradaterebra planecosta (Barnard, 1958)
- Gradaterebra scalariformis Cotton & Godfrey, 1932
- Gradaterebra severa (Melvill, 1897)
- Gradaterebra sorrentensis (Aubry, 1999)
- Gradaterebra taylori (Reeve, 1860)
