= John Lightfoot (biologist) =

English priest and biologist (1735–1788)

- Born: 9 December 1735; Newent, Gloucestershire, England
- Died: 20 February 1788 (aged 52); Uxbridge, Middlesex
- Education: Pembroke College, Oxford (BA 1756, MA 1766)
- Known for: Flora Scotica
- Scientific career
- Fields: Botany, Conchology
- Workplaces: Gotham, Nottinghamshire (rector)
- Author abbrev. (botany): Lightf.

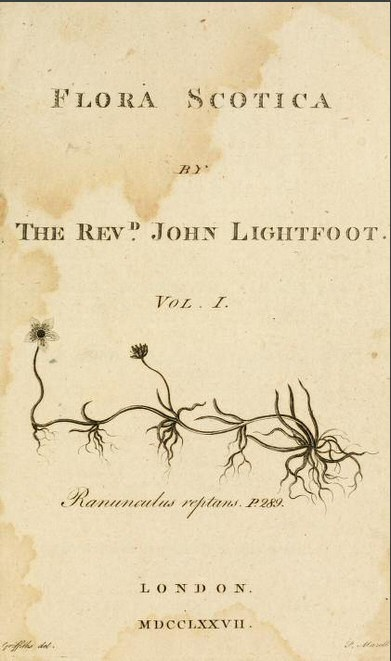
Title page of Flora Scotica, 1777, by the Reverend John Lightfoot

The Reverend John Lightfoot (9 December 1735 – 20 February 1788) was an English parson-naturalist, spending much of his free time as a conchologist and botanist. He was a systematic and effective curator of the private museum of Margaret Bentinck, Duchess of Portland. He is best known for his Flora Scotica which pioneered the scientific study of the plants and fungi of Scotland. He was elected a Fellow of the Royal Society for his scientific work.

He was an excellent scholar in many branches of literature; but after the study of his profession, he addicted himself chiefly to that of botany and conchyliologie [sic]. He excelled in both.

— Thomas Pennant

== Life and work ==
Lightfoot was born in Newent, Gloucestershire. His father Stephen Lightfoot was a yeoman farmer. He was educated at Pembroke College, Oxford. He gained a BA in 1756 and an MA in 1766. He was elected as a Fellow of the Royal Society in 1785.

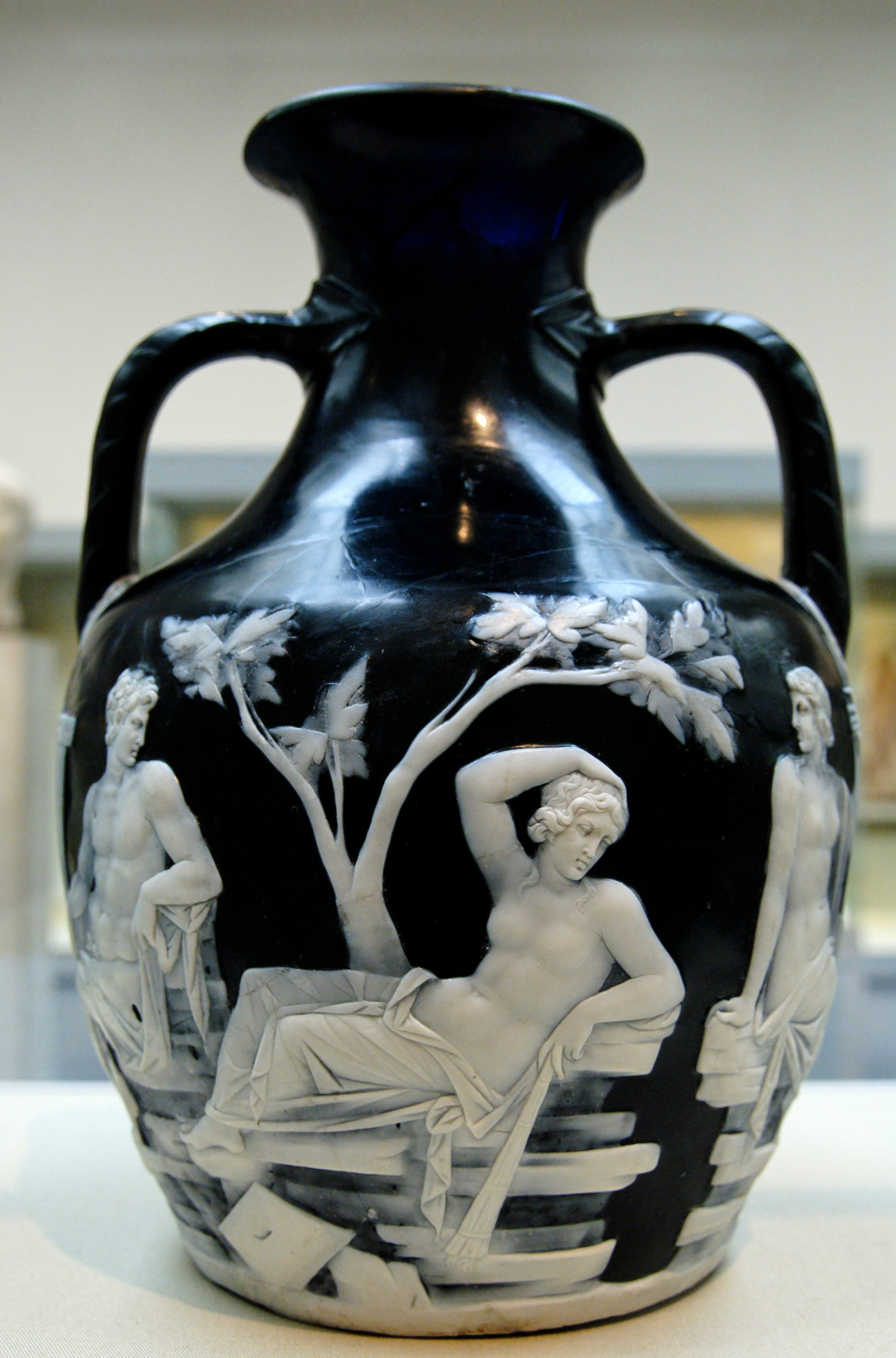
The Roman cameo glass "Portland Vase" from about AD 25 is the most famous object in the collection that Lightfoot curated.

Lightfoot was Rector of Gotham, and the chaplain and librarian for Margaret Bentinck, Duchess of Portland. He was also curate of Colnbrook, Buckinghamshire and then of Uxbridge, Middlesex, a position he held for the rest of his life. With plenty of free time from his light duties as a clergyman, he curated the Duchess's museum collection or "Cabinet of Curiosities" expertly, leading ultimately to a detailed and accurate inventory and description of her private "Portland Museum", published as an auction catalogue after her death. Among the collection that Lightfoot had curated was the ancient "Portland Vase" now named after her family.

By 1770 Lightfoot had a close and useful friendship with the leading botanist in England at the time, Joseph Banks, and with a pupil of the Swedish botanist Carl von Linné (Linnaeus), Daniel Solander. It was an age for scientists to go on journeys of carefully documented discovery: Banks and Solander accompanied Captain James Cook on a voyage of exploration to the Pacific Ocean. Lightfoot travelled from Chester to Scotland with the Welsh author Thomas Pennant and the Rev. J. Stewart; the journey led to an acclaimed book by Pennant, and provided most of the materials for Lightfoot's Flora Scotica (2 vols, 1777), which he published at his own expense. Apart from Banks and Solander, Lightfoot also knew many of the other founders of the Linnaean Society, including William Hudson, James Dickson, James Edward Smith, Gilbert White, John Sibthorpe and James Bolton; Lightfoot lived just long enough to see the society founded in 1788.

Apart from the Flora Scotica, for which he is chiefly remembered, Lightfoot wrote An Account of Some Minute British Shells, Either not Duly Observed, or Totally Unnoticed by Authors (1786), and described a number of species including the reed warbler in 1785. He travelled in Wales at the instigation of Joseph Banks, but his manuscript on the Welsh flora was never published.

In November 1780 Lightfoot married the daughter of William Burton Raynes, a wealthy miller from Uxbridge. They had two sons and three daughters. He died in Uxbridge and is buried at Cowley, Middlesex. His considerable library was auctioned by the publisher and bookseller Benjamin White and Son in 1789. Part of his plant collection survives at the Royal Botanic Gardens, Kew.

== Flora Scotica ==
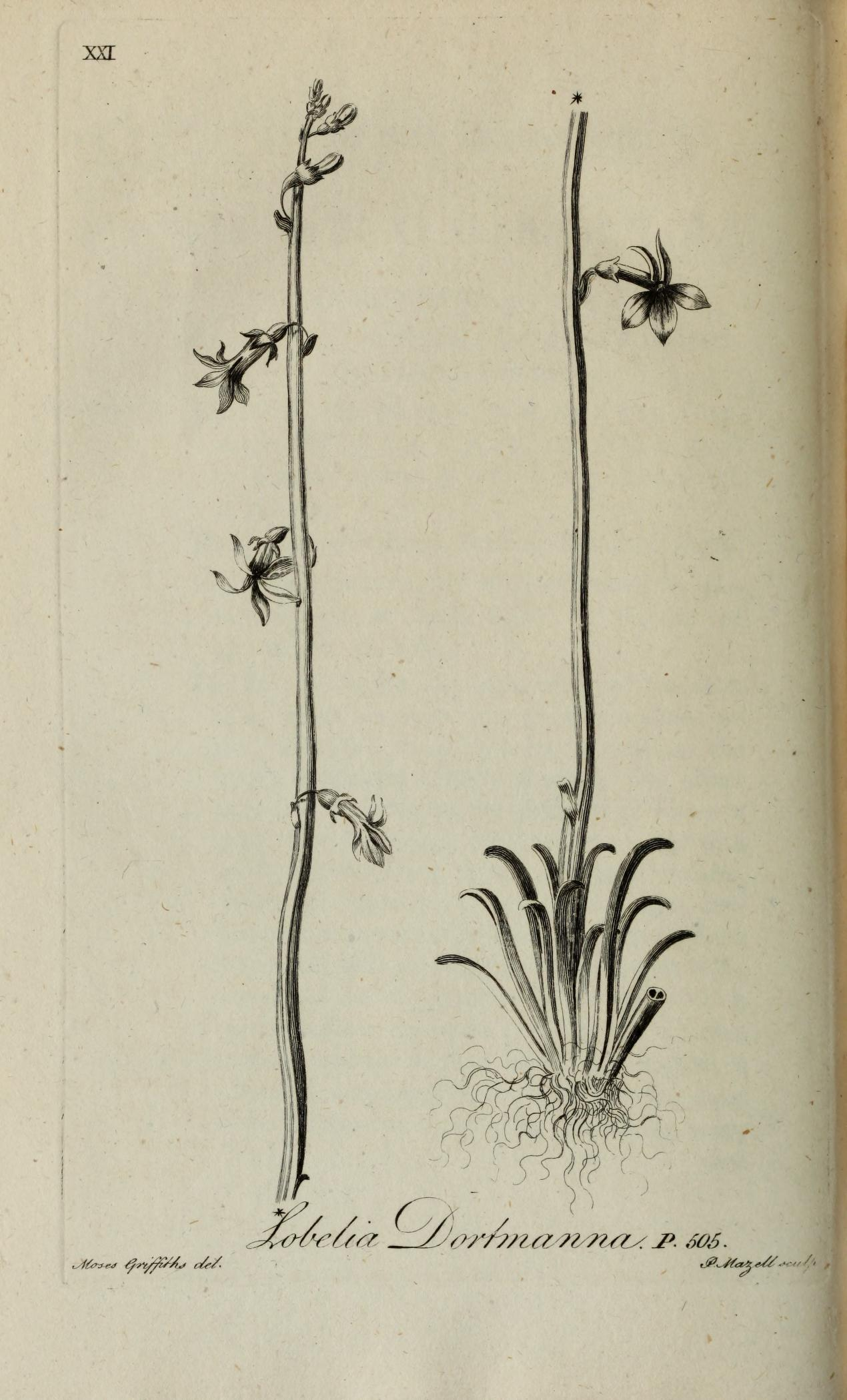
Lobelia dortmanna from Lightfoot's 1777 Flora Scotica, painted by Moses Griffith and engraved by Peter Mazell

The Flora Scotica: or, a systematic arrangement, in the Linnaean method, of the native plants of Scotland and the Hebrides, published in London in 1777 as a bulky book of two volumes for a total of 1151 pages, is Lightfoot's greatest work. Many of the illustrations are drawn by Pennant's artist, Moses Griffith, and engraved by Peter Mazell; some are both drawn and engraved by Mazell.

As well as flowering plants, the "Cryptogamia", including ferns ("filices"), mosses ("musci"), algae and fungi, are covered, starting on page 643. Lightfoot covers the liverworts, recognising only the genera Marchantia, Jungermannia, Targionia, Riccia and Ryssus, but including also "Lichen" as "Algae Terrestres", terrestrial algae.

Only nine genera of fungi are recognised in the book: Agaricus, Boletus, Hydnum, Phallus, Helvella, Peziza, Clavaria, Lycoperdon, and Mucor (listed on page 645); a tenth fungal genus, Tremella is covered, but included among his algae. Scottish Fungi note that "While his classification might be a bit wonky by today's understanding, most of the species he recorded can be traced to modern taxa", and that he provided the first British records for the chanterelle and the summer truffle.

The book has an "English and Scotch Index of the Names of Plants" which however is entirely in English, the "Erse Index" of Gaelic names following the list of English ones. There is also a Latin index to the genera (but not to individual species).

== Species named in his honour ==
The plant genus Lightfootia, in the Campanulaceae (bellflower family), was named after him by the French botanist Charles Louis L'Héritier de Brutelle.

The World Register of Marine Species lists the following species named after individuals named Lightfoot but none is named after John Lightfoot.

- Epinephelus lightfooti Fowler, 1907: synonym of Alphestes afer (Bloch, 1793) commemorated Benjamin H. Lightfoot who collected fishes in late 1800s in Caribbean.

The following were named after Robert M. Lightfoot of the South African Museum (Cape Town):

- Terebra lightfooti E. A. Smith, 1899: synonym of Euterebra lightfooti (E. A. Smith, 1899)
- Zafrona lightfooti (E. A. Smith, 1901) (and synonyms Anachis lightfooti, Columbella lightfooti)
