= Gradaterebra assecla =

Scientific classification
- Kingdom: Animalia
- Phylum: Mollusca
- Class: Gastropoda
- Subclass: Caenogastropoda
- Order: Neogastropoda
- Family: Terebridae
- Genus: Gradaterebra
- Species: G. assecla

Binomial name
- Gradaterebra assecla (Iredale, 1924)

Synonyms
- Euterebra assecla (Iredale, 1924); Pervicacia assecla Iredale, 1924 (original combination); Terebra assecla (Iredale, 1924)

Species of gastropod

Gradaterebra assecla is a species of sea snail, a marine gastropod mollusc in the family Terebridae, the auger snails.
