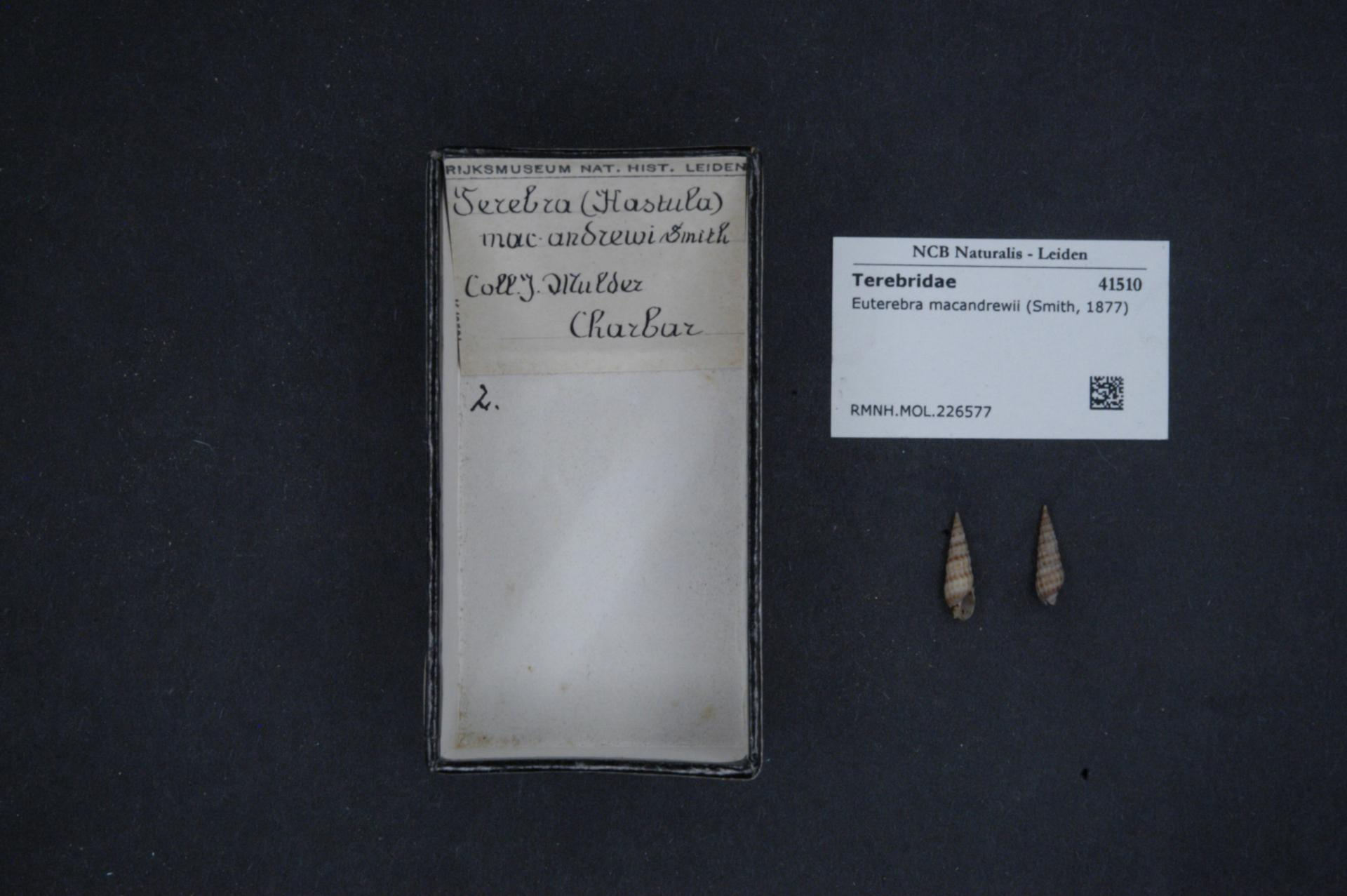

Scientific classification
- Kingdom: Animalia
- Phylum: Mollusca
- Class: Gastropoda
- Subclass: Caenogastropoda
- Order: Neogastropoda
- Family: Terebridae
- Genus: Partecosta
- Species: P. macandrewii

Binomial name
- Partecosta macandrewii (E.A. Smith, 1877)

Synonyms
- Euterebra macandrewii (E. A. Smith, 1877); Terebra (Myurella) macandrewii E. A. Smith, 1877 (basionym); Terebra macandrewii E.A. Smith, 1877

= Partecosta macandrewii =

Species of gastropod

Partecosta macandrewii is a species of sea snail, a marine gastropod mollusk in the family Terebridae, the auger snails.

== Distribution ==
This marine species occurs in the Persian Gulf
