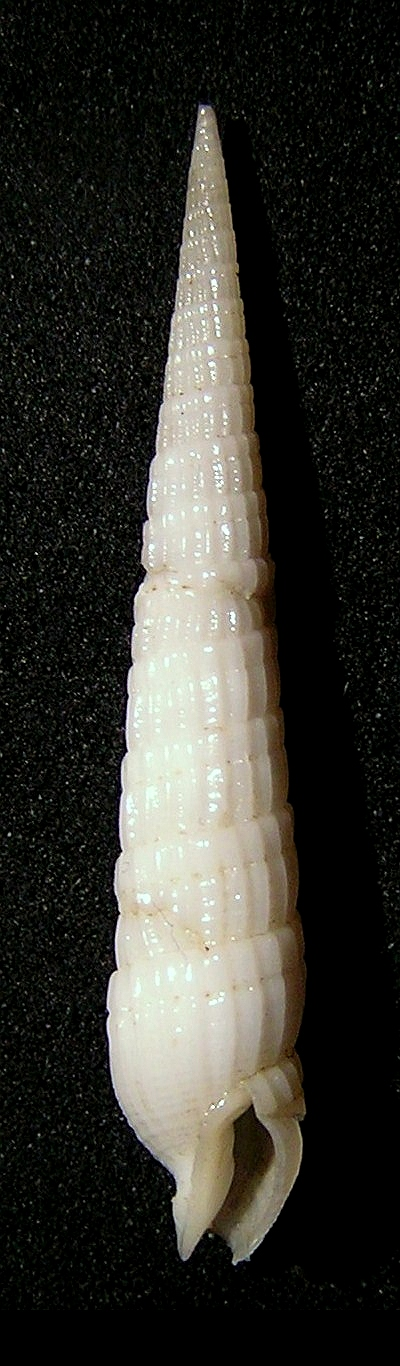
- Apertural view of a shell of Terebra elliscrossi

Scientific classification
- Kingdom: Animalia
- Phylum: Mollusca
- Class: Gastropoda
- Subclass: Caenogastropoda
- Order: Neogastropoda
- Superfamily: Conoidea
- Family: Terebridae
- Genus: Terebra
- Species: T. elliscrossi

Binomial name
- Terebra elliscrossi Bratcher, 1979

Synonyms
- Cinguloterebra elliscrossi (Bratcher, 1979); Triplostephanus elliscrossi (Bratcher, 1979)

= Terebra elliscrossi =

Species of gastropod

Terebra elliscrossi is a species of sea snail, a marine gastropod mollusc in the family Terebridae, the auger snails.

== Description ==
The length of the shell varies between 34 mm and 83 mm.

== Distribution ==
This marine species occurs off Madagascar and Hawaii.
