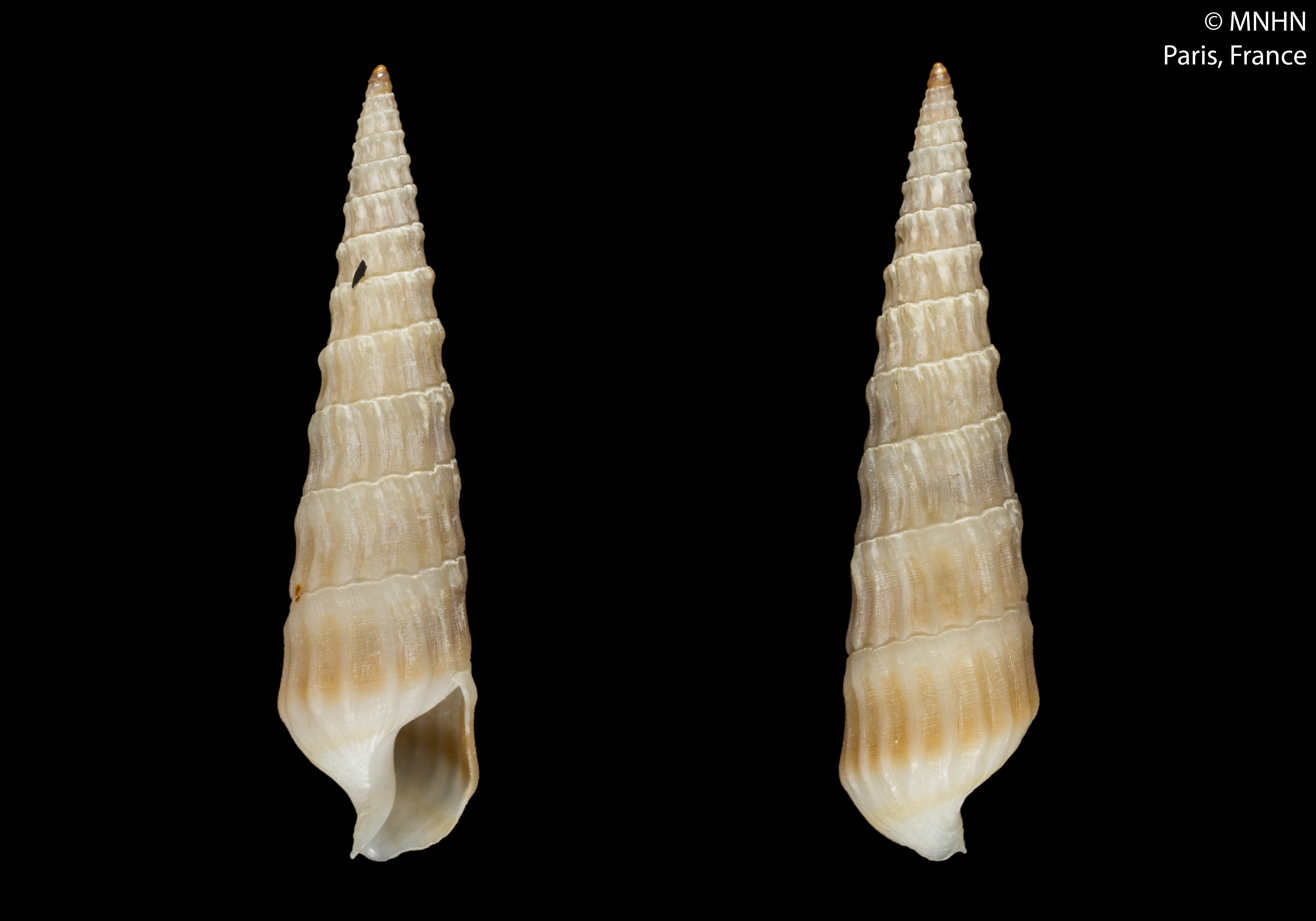
- Shell of Pellifronia brianhayesi

Scientific classification
- Kingdom: Animalia
- Phylum: Mollusca
- Class: Gastropoda
- Subclass: Caenogastropoda
- Order: Neogastropoda
- Superfamily: Conoidea
- Family: Terebridae
- Genus: Pellifronia; Terryn & Holford, 2008

Type species
- Terebra jungi Lai, 2001

Species
- See text

= Pellifronia =

Genus of gastropods

Pellifronia is a genus of sea snails, marine gastropod mollusks in the subfamily Pellifroniinae of the family Terebridae, the auger snails, sunfamily Pellifroniinae (

== Species ==
Species within the genus Pellifronia include:

- Pellifronia brianhayesi (Terryn & Sprague, 2008)
- Pellifronia jungi (Lai, 2001)
