= Partecosta fuscobasis =

Scientific classification
- Kingdom: Animalia
- Phylum: Mollusca
- Class: Gastropoda
- Subclass: Caenogastropoda
- Order: Neogastropoda
- Family: Terebridae
- Genus: Partecosta
- Species: P. fuscobasis

Binomial name
- Partecosta fuscobasis (E.A. Smith, 1877)

Synonyms
- Euterebra fuscobasis (E. A. Smith, 1877); Strioterberum wilkinsi Dance & Eames, 1966; Terebra (Myurella) fuscobasis E. A. Smith, 1877 (basionym); Terebra fuscobasis E.A. Smith, 1877 (original combination)

Species of gastropod

Partecosta fuscobasis is a species of sea snail, a marine gastropod mollusk in the family Terebridae, the auger snails.

== Distribution ==
This marine species occurs in the Persian Gulf
