= Microtrypetes =

Scientific classification
- Kingdom: Animalia
- Phylum: Mollusca
- Class: Gastropoda
- Subclass: Caenogastropoda
- Order: Neogastropoda
- Superfamily: Conoidea
- Family: Terebridae
- Genus: Microtrypetes; Pilsbry & Lowe, 1932

Synonyms
- Terebra (Microtrypetes) Pilsbry & Lowe, 1932 (original rank)

Genus of gastropods

Microtrypetes is a genus of marine snails, gastropod mollusks in the family Terebridae, subfamily Terebrinae.

== Species ==
Species within the genus Microtrypetes include:

- Microtrypetes iola (Pilsbry & Lowe, 1932)
- Microtrypetes polypenus (Pilsbry & Lowe, 1932)
