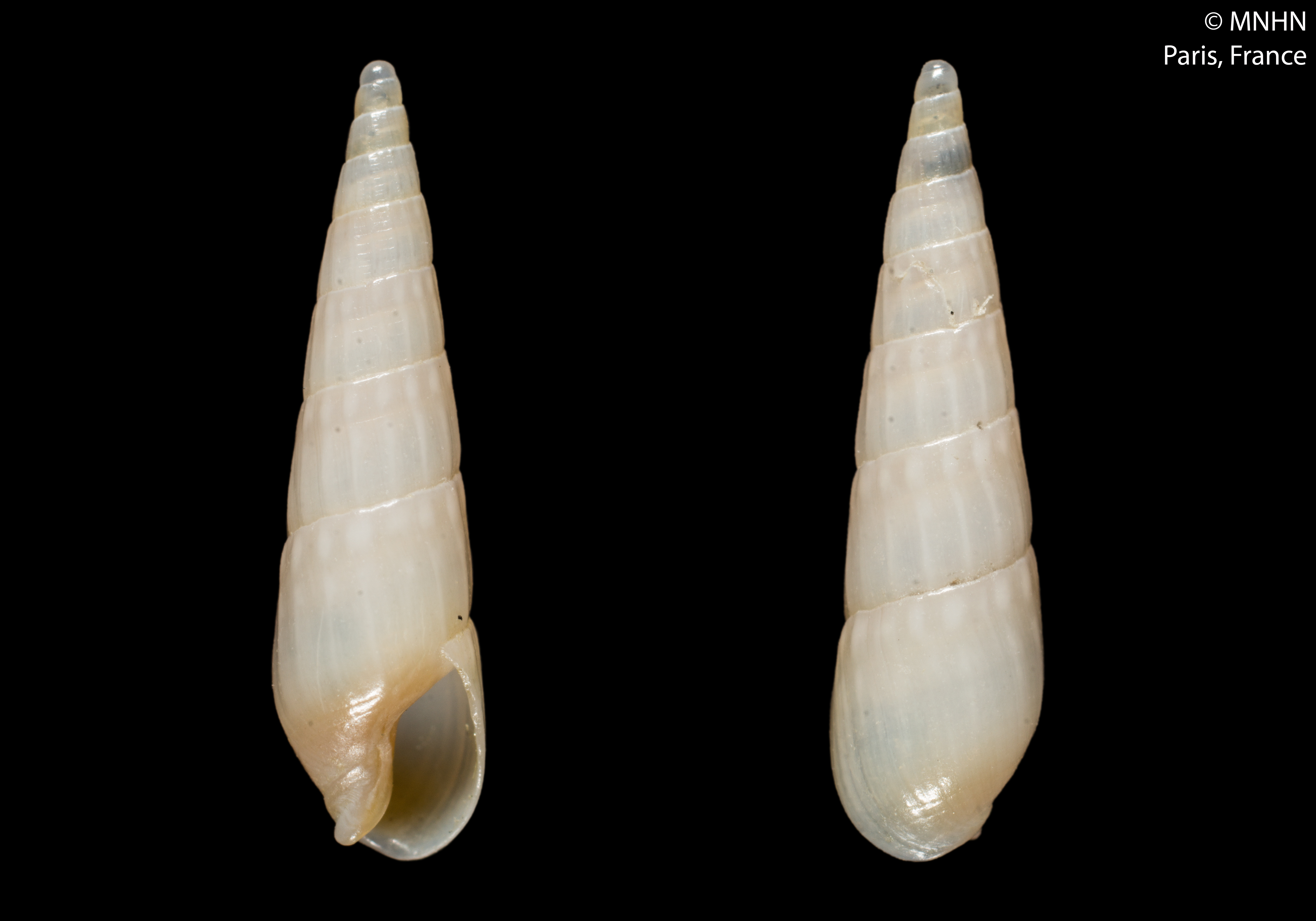
- Shell of Partecosta albofuscata (holotype at MNHN, Paris)

Scientific classification
- Kingdom: Animalia
- Phylum: Mollusca
- Class: Gastropoda
- Subclass: Caenogastropoda
- Order: Neogastropoda
- Family: Terebridae
- Genus: Partecosta; Dance & Eames, 1966

Type species
- Strioterebrum (Partecosta) wilkinsi Dance & Eames, 1966

Species
- See text.

Synonyms
- Strioterebrum (Partecosta) Dance & Eames, 1966 (original rank)

= Partecosta =

Genus of gastropods

Partecosta is a genus of sea snails in the family Terebridae (subfamily Pervicaciinae), the auger snails. They are found in the Indian Ocean in intertidal and shallow subtidal areas.

== Species ==
Species within the genus Partecosta include:

- Partecosta albofuscata (Bozzetti, 2008)
- Partecosta arabica Terryn, Rosado & Gori, 2020
- Partecosta aurata Gargiulo, 2021
- Partecosta bertini Terryn, 2021
- Partecosta bozzettii Malcolm, Terryn & Fedosov, 2020
- Partecosta brunneanebulosa Terryn, Rosado & Gori, 2020
- Partecosta fuscobasis (E. A. Smith, 1877)
- Partecosta fuscocincta (E. A. Smith, 1877)
- Partecosta fuscolutea (Bozzetti, 2008)
- Partecosta herosae (Terryn & Rosado, 2011)
- Partecosta keppensi Terryn, Rosado & Gori, 2020
- Partecosta macandrewii (E. A. Smith, 1877)
- Partecosta macleani (Bratcher, 1988)
- Partecosta milesi Terryn, Holford & Lussi, 2024
- Partecosta nassoides (Hinds, 1844)
- Partecosta olivacea Terryn, Rosado & Gori, 2020
- Partecosta padangensis (Thiele, 1925)
- Partecosta sandrinae (Aubry, 2008)
- Partecosta tantilla (E. A. Smith, 1873)
- Partecosta tenera (Hinds, 1844)
- Partecosta trilineata (Bozzetti, 2008)
- Partecosta varia (Bozzetti, 2008)
- Partecosta veliae (Aubry, 1991)

Species brought into synonymy

- Partecosta marqueti (Aubry, 1994): synonym of Hastula marqueti (Aubry, 1994)
