= Gradaterebra kowiensis =

Scientific classification
- Kingdom: Animalia
- Phylum: Mollusca
- Class: Gastropoda
- Subclass: Caenogastropoda
- Order: Neogastropoda
- Family: Terebridae
- Genus: Gradaterebra
- Species: G. kowiensis

Binomial name
- Gradaterebra kowiensis (Turton, 1932)

Synonyms
- Euterebra kowiensis (W. H. Turton, 1932); Terebra kowiensis Turton, 1932

Species of gastropod

Gradaterebra kowiensis is a species of sea snail, a marine gastropod mollusc in the family Terebridae, the auger snails.

== Distribution ==
This marine species occurs off Port Alfred, South Africa.
