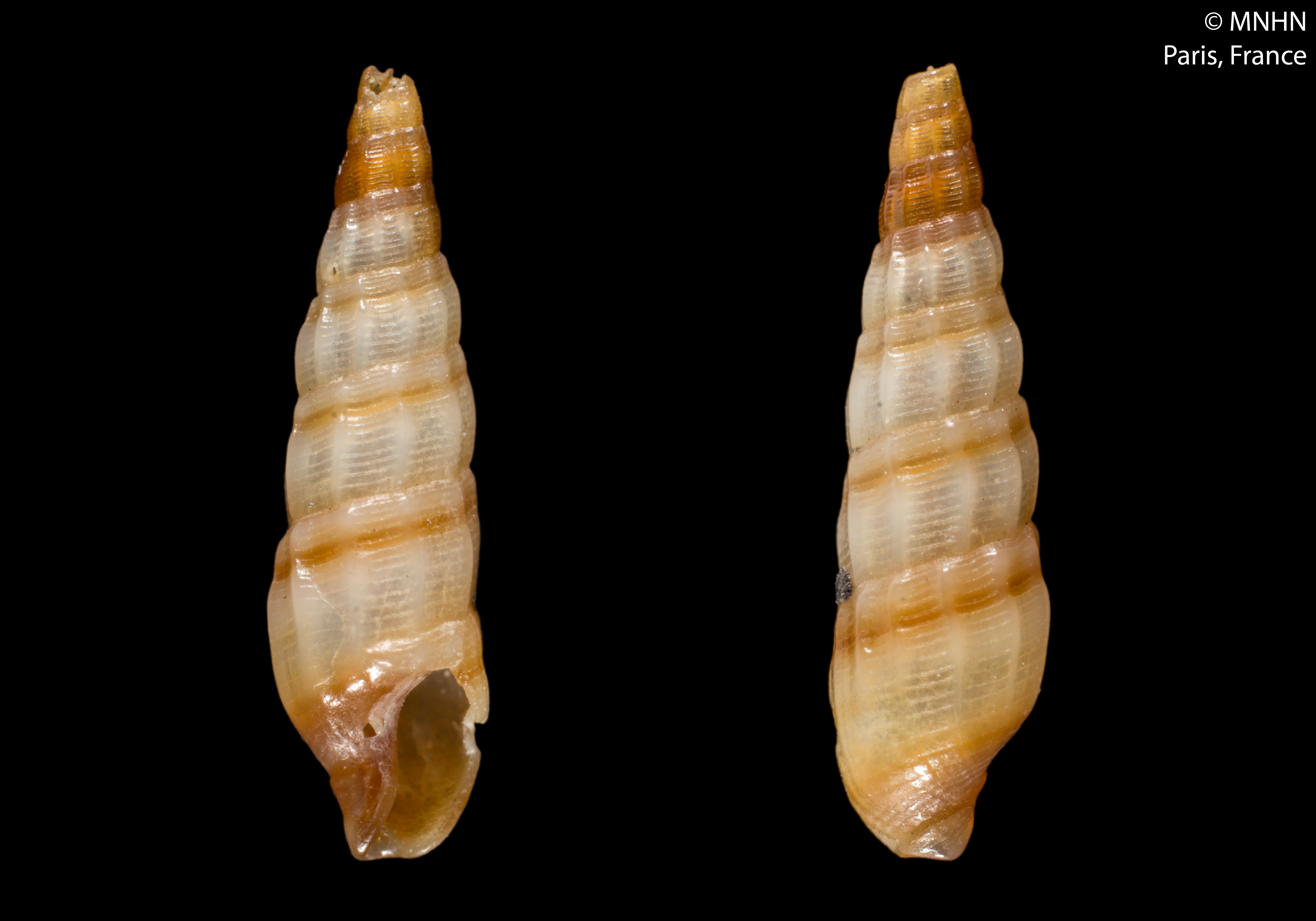
- Shell of Partecosta fuscolutea (holotype at MNHN, Paris)

Scientific classification
- Kingdom: Animalia
- Phylum: Mollusca
- Class: Gastropoda
- Subclass: Caenogastropoda
- Order: Neogastropoda
- Family: Terebridae
- Genus: Partecosta
- Species: P. fuscolutea

Binomial name
- Partecosta fuscolutea (Bozzetti, 2008)

Synonyms
- Euterebra fuscolutea Bozzetti, 2008 (original combination)

= Partecosta fuscolutea =

Species of gastropod

Partecosta fuscolutea is a species of sea snail, a marine gastropod mollusc in the family Terebridae, the auger snails.

== Description ==
The length of the shell attains 7.2 mm.

== Distribution ==
This marine species occurs off the coast of Madagascar.
