= Gradaterebra severa =

Scientific classification
- Kingdom: Animalia
- Phylum: Mollusca
- Class: Gastropoda
- Subclass: Caenogastropoda
- Order: Neogastropoda
- Family: Terebridae
- Genus: Gradaterebra
- Species: G. severa

Binomial name
- Gradaterebra severa (Melvill, 1897)

Synonyms
- Euterebra severa (Melvill, 1897); Terebra severa Melvill, 1897

Species of gastropod

Gradaterebra severa is a species of sea snail, a marine gastropod mollusc in the family Terebridae, the auger snails.
