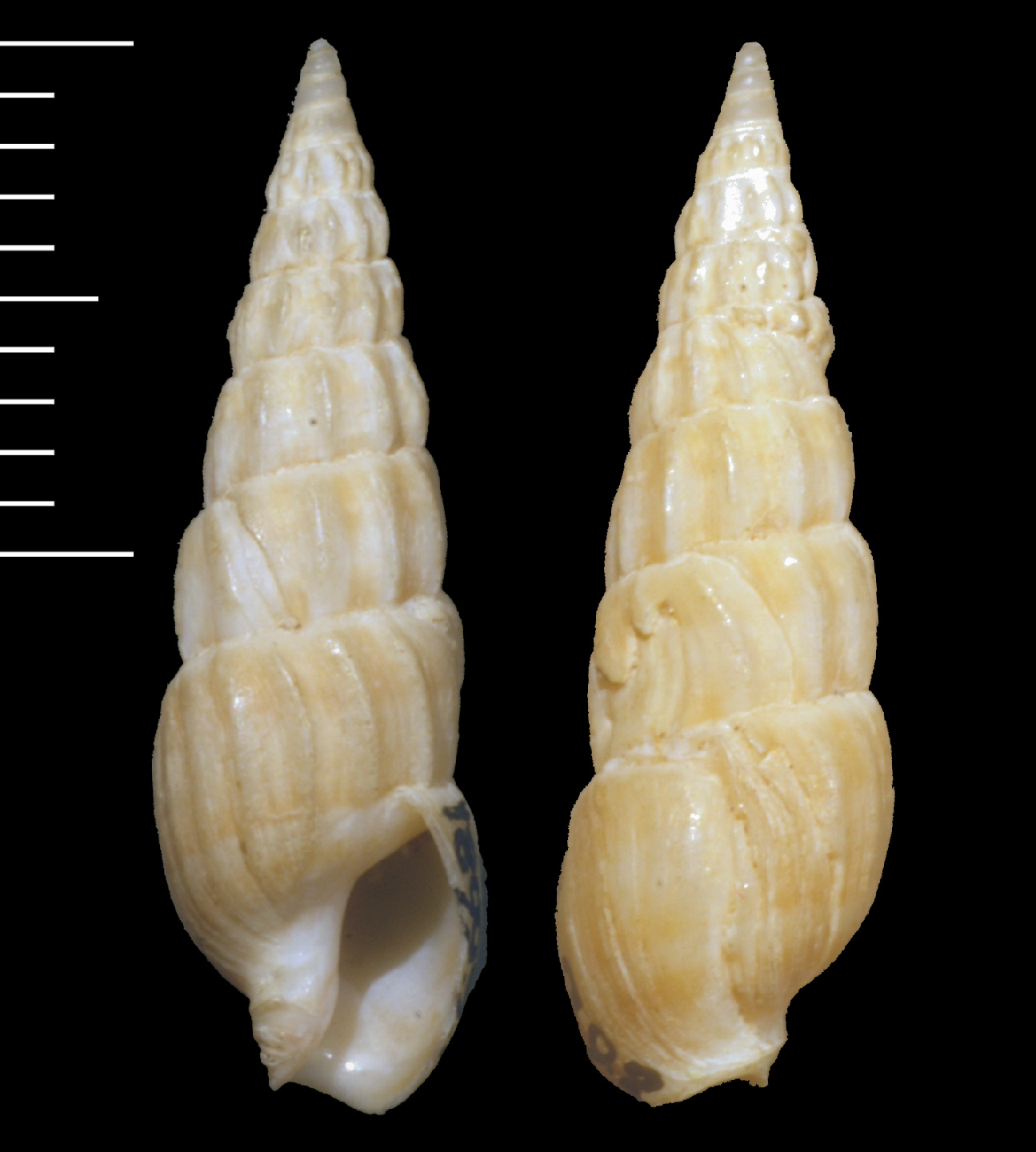
- Shell of Gradaterebra lightfooti lectotype in the Natural History Museum, London
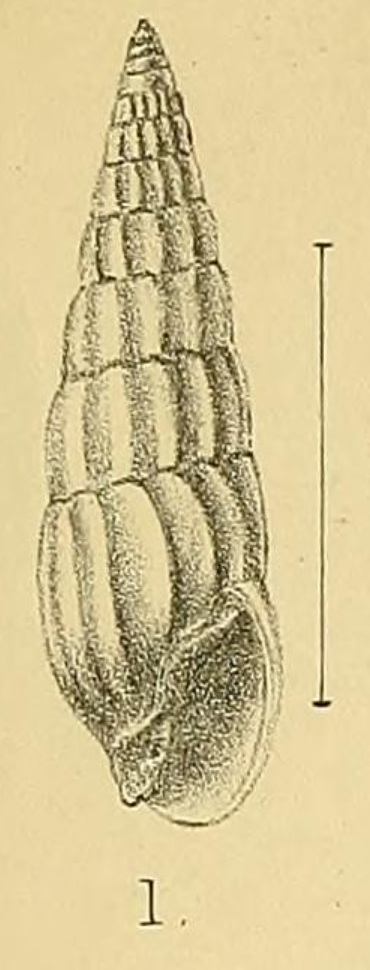
- Illustration accompanying Edgar Albert Smith's original 1899 description

Scientific classification
- Kingdom: Animalia
- Phylum: Mollusca
- Class: Gastropoda
- Subclass: Caenogastropoda
- Order: Neogastropoda
- Family: Terebridae
- Genus: Gradaterebra
- Species: G. lightfooti

Binomial name
- Gradaterebra lightfooti (E.A. Smith, 1899)

Synonyms
- Euterebra lightfooti (E. A. Smith, 1899); Terebra lightfooti E. A. Smith, 1899 (original combination)

= Gradaterebra lightfooti =

Species of gastropod

Gradaterebra lightfooti is a species of sea snail, a marine gastropod mollusk in the family Terebridae, the auger snails.

== Distribution ==
It is found in Table Bay, Cape Point, Brown's Bank, False Bay, and Saldanha Bay, South Africa. The type locality is Table Bay.
