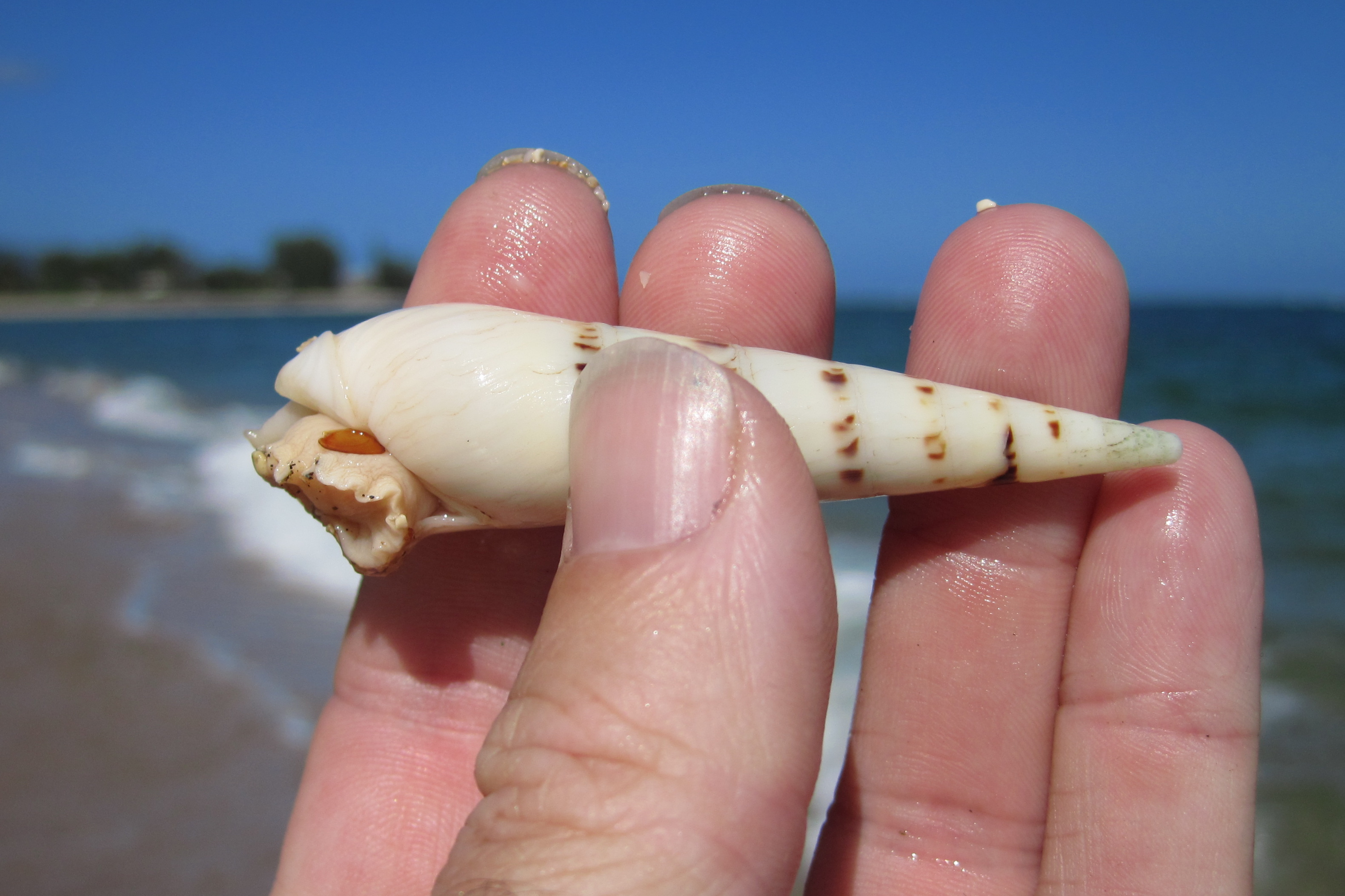
- live Oxymeris maculata

Scientific classification
- Kingdom: Animalia
- Phylum: Mollusca
- Class: Gastropoda
- Subclass: Caenogastropoda
- Order: Neogastropoda
- Superfamily: Conoidea
- Family: Terebridae; Mörch, 1852

Genera
- See text.

Diversity
- more than 400 species

Synonyms
- Acusidae; Pervicaciidae

= Terebridae =

Family of sea snails

The Terebridae, commonly referred to as auger shells or auger snails, is a family of predatory marine gastropods in the superfamily Conoidea. They have extremely high-spired shells with numerous whorls; their common name refers to the resemblance of their shells to rock-drill bit. More than 400 species are recently known worldwide.

== Taxonomy ==
This family consists of the following subfamilies (according to the taxonomy of the Gastropoda by Bouchet & Rocroi, 2005):

- Terebrinae Mörch, 1852 - synonyms: Acusidae; Acidae Gray, 1853 (inv.)
- Pellifroniinae Fedosov, Malcolm, Terryn, Gorson, Modica, Holford & Puillandre, 2020 (with de deep-water genera Pellifronia and Bathyterebra)
- Pervicaciinae Rudman, 1969 (with the predominantly Indo-Pacific genera Duplicaria and Partecosta).

In 2019 there was a comprehensive revision of the taxonomy of the Terebridae by Fedosov, A. E.; Malcolm, G.; Terryn, Y.; Gorson, J.; Modica, M. V.; Holford, M.; Puillandre, N. in the Journal of Molluscan Studies, including the definition of new genera and the redistribution of many species to other genera.

== Shell description ==
The shells of the sea snails in this family are typically shaped like slender augers or screws. In that respect they share certain shell characters with the family Turritellidae, the turret shells.

One characteristic that distinguishes Terebridae from Turritellidae is the short anterior canal or notch in the aperture of the shell. Terebridae shells also tend to have characteristically flattened versus convex whorls, and they often have one or two plaits on the columella.

Numerous species in this family are grouped under the genera Terebra or Hastula, and a minority of species are placed in four other genera.

== Life habits ==
These snails are sand-dwelling carnivores which live in warmer waters. In most species, a venomous barb similar to that of the cone snails, (see Conidae), is used to stun and immobilize prey, which typically consists of various marine worms.

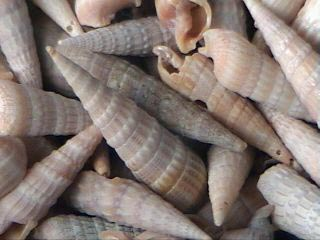
A grow of shells of the Atlantic or eastern auger, Terebra dislocata

== Genera ==
Genera in the family Terebridae include:

- Bathyterebra Fedosov, Malcolm, Terryn, Gorson, Modica, Holford & Puillandre, 2020
- Cinguloterebra Oyama, 1961
- Clathroterebra Oyama, 1961
- Duplicaria Dall, 1908
- Euterebra Cotton & Godfrey, 1932
- Gemmaterebra Cotton, 1952
- Gradaterebra Cotton & Godfrey, 1932
- Granuliterebra Oyama, 1961
- Hastula H. Adams & A. Adams, 1853
- Hastulopsis Oyama, 1961
- † Kaweka Marwick, 1931
- Maculauger Fedosov, Malcolm, Terryn, Gorson, Modica, Holford & Puillandre, 2020
- Microtrypetes Pilsbry & Lowe, 1932
- † Mirula Palmer, 1942
- Myurella Hinds, 1844
- Myurellopsis Fedosov, Malcolm, Terryn, Gorson, Modica, Holford & Puillandre, 2020
- Neoterebra Fedosov, Malcolm, Terryn, Gorson, Modica, Holford & Puillandre, 2020
- Oxymeris Dall, 1903
- Partecosta Dance & Eames, 1966
- Pellifronia Terryn & Holford, 2008
- Perirhoe Dall, 1908
- Pristiterebra Oyama, 1961
- Profunditerebra Fedosov, Malcolm, Terryn, Gorson, Modica, Holford & Puillandre, 2020
- Punctoterebra Bartsch, 1923
- Strioterebrum Sacco, 1891
- Terebra Bruguière, 1789 -- type taxon
- † Zeacuminia Finlay, 1930
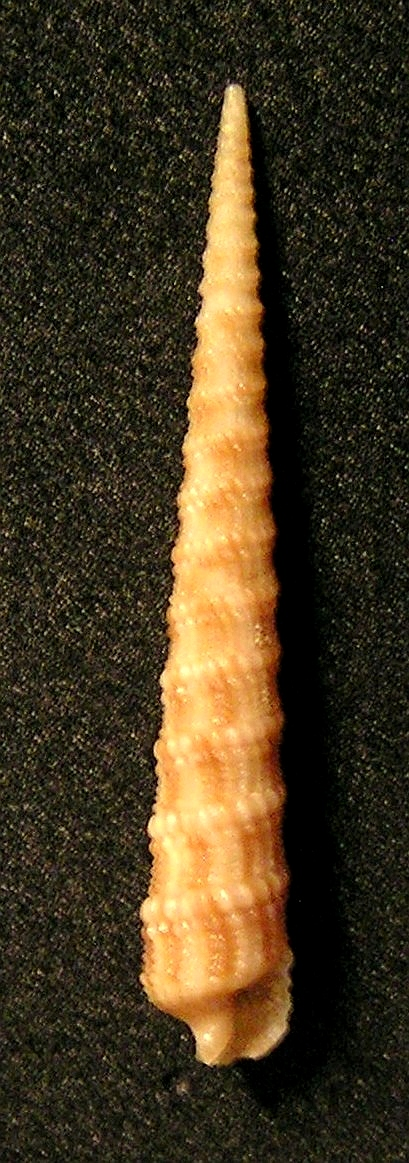
Terebra salisburyi

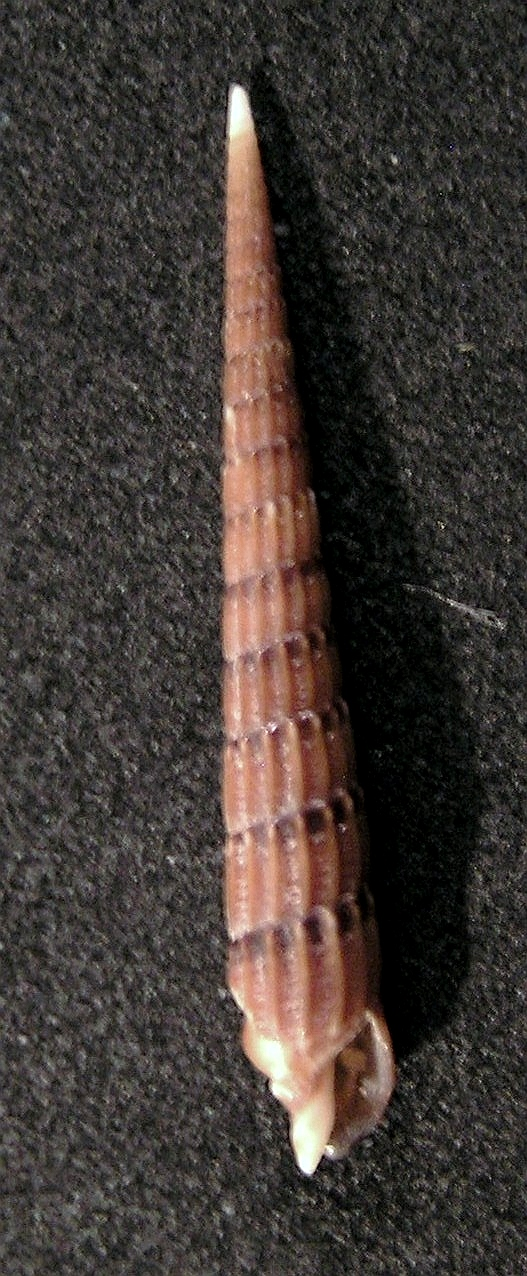
Myurella mactanensis

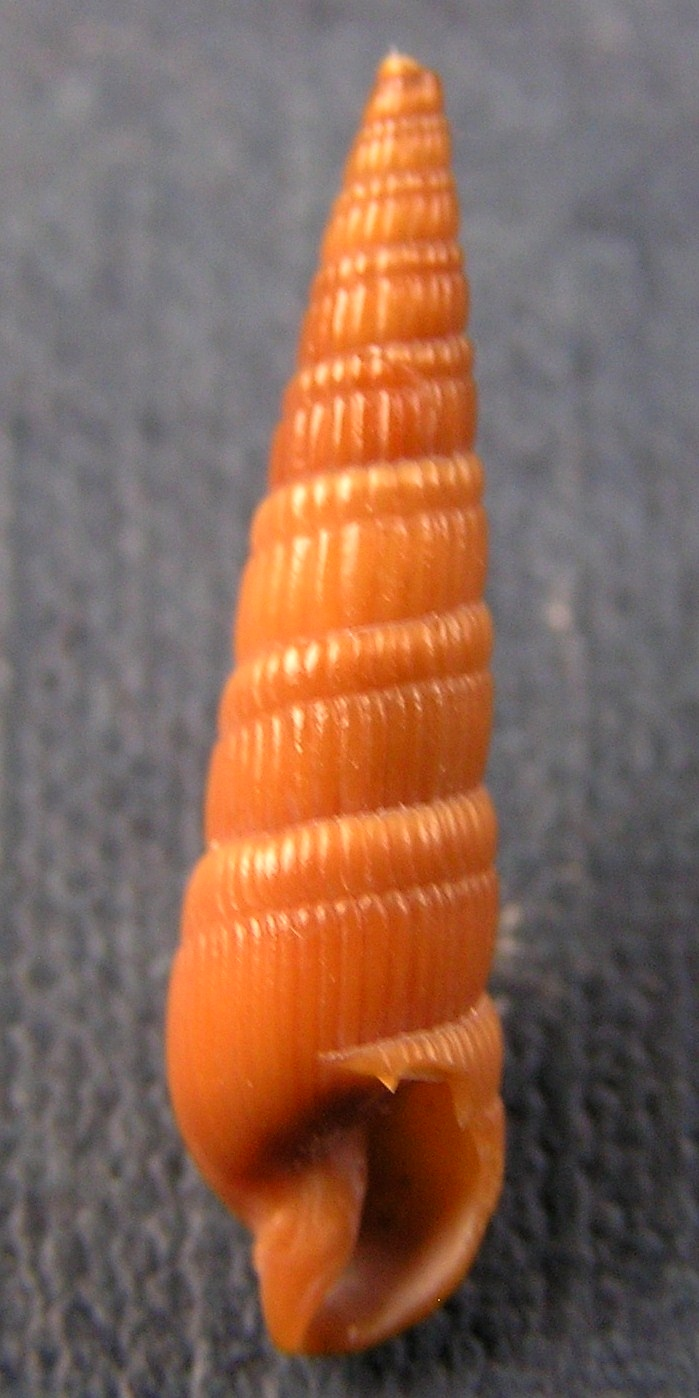
Duplicaria kieneri

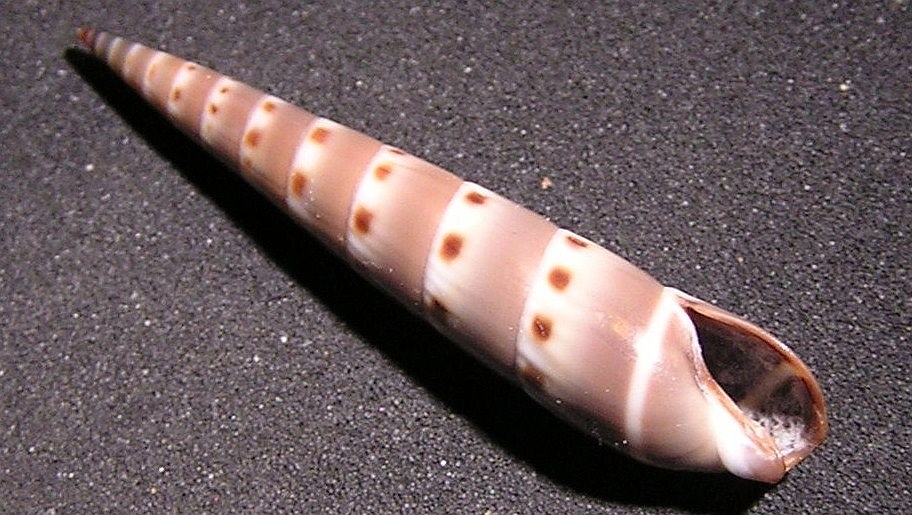
Hastula strigilata

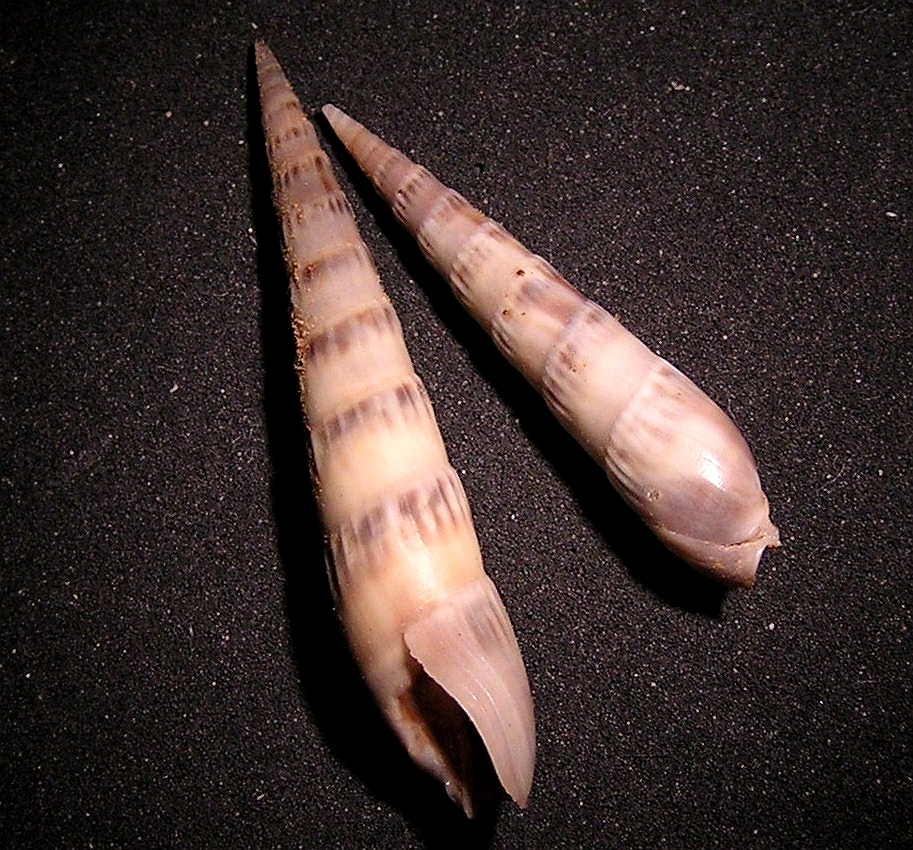
Hastula cinerea

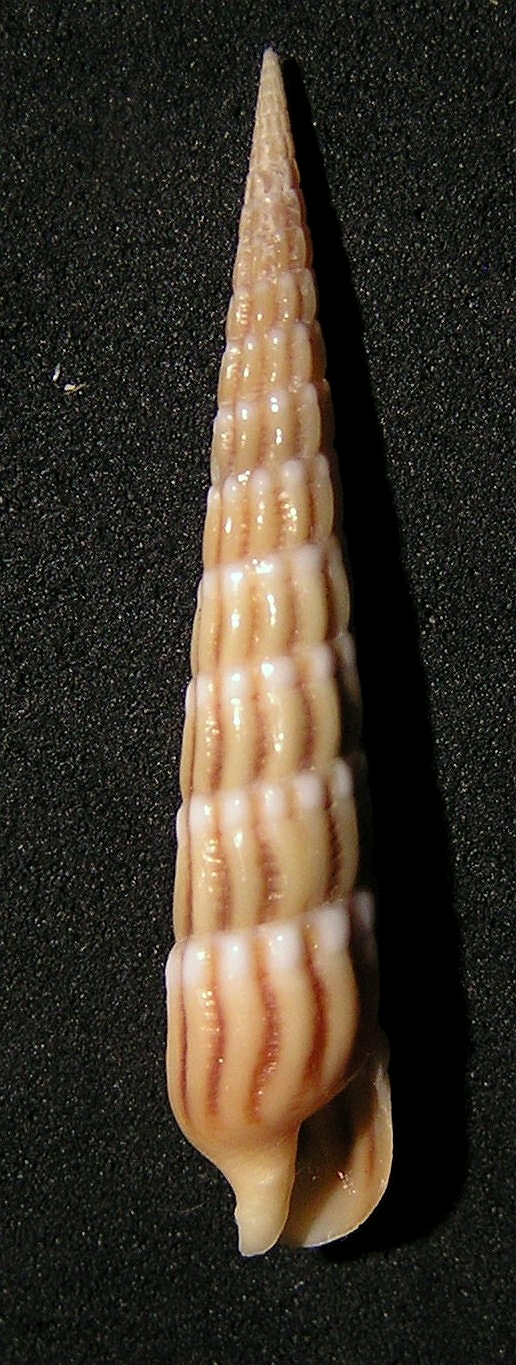
Myurellopsis undulata

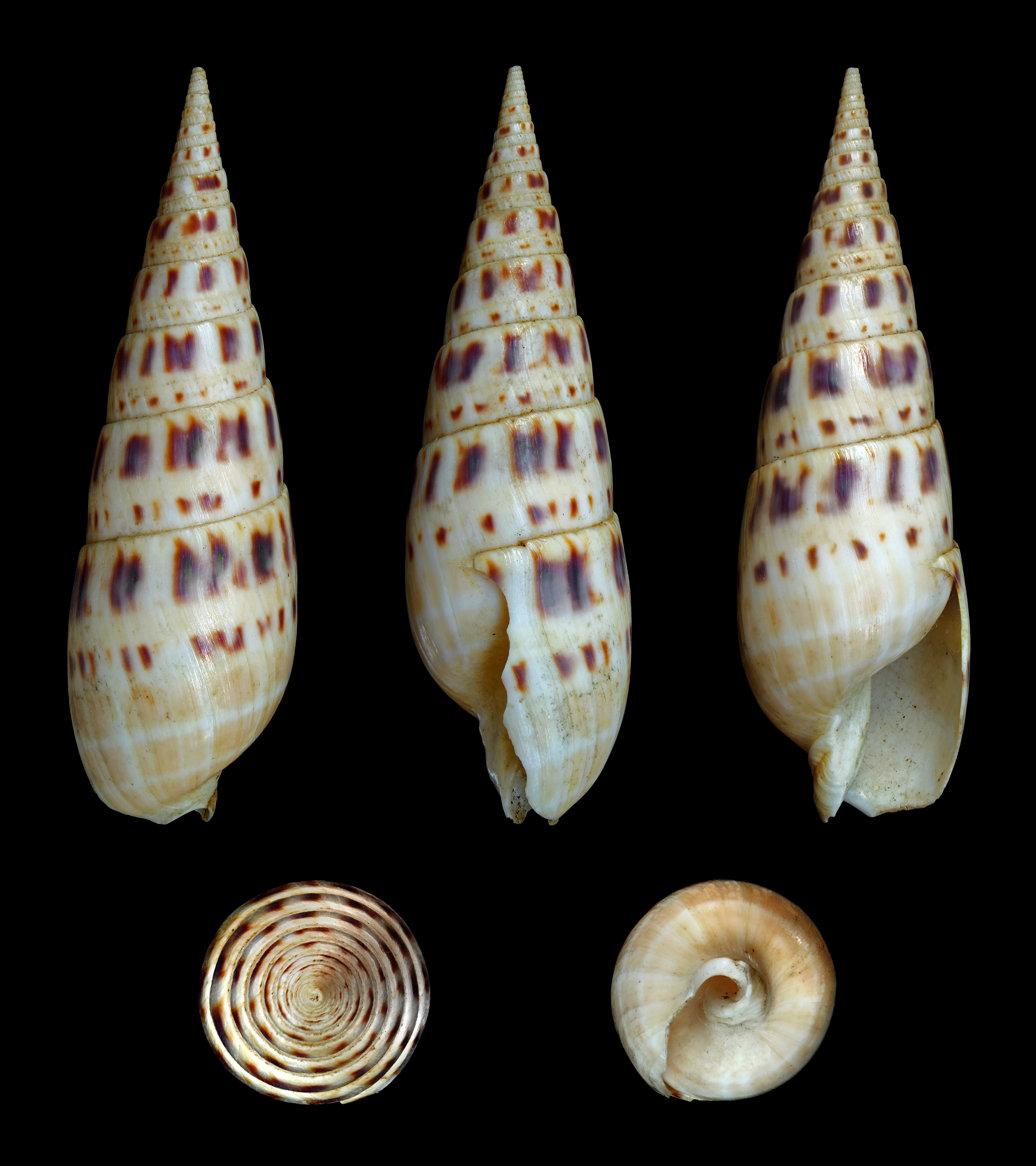
Oxymeris maculata

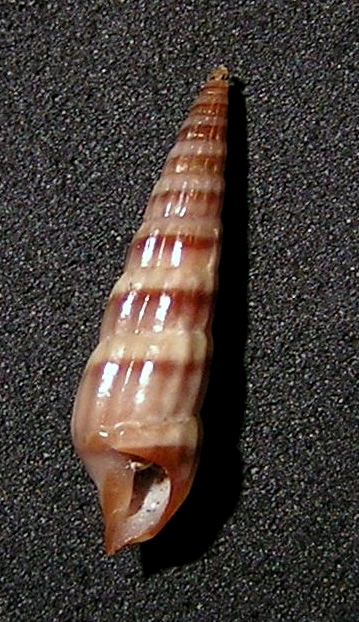
Strioterebrum plumbeum

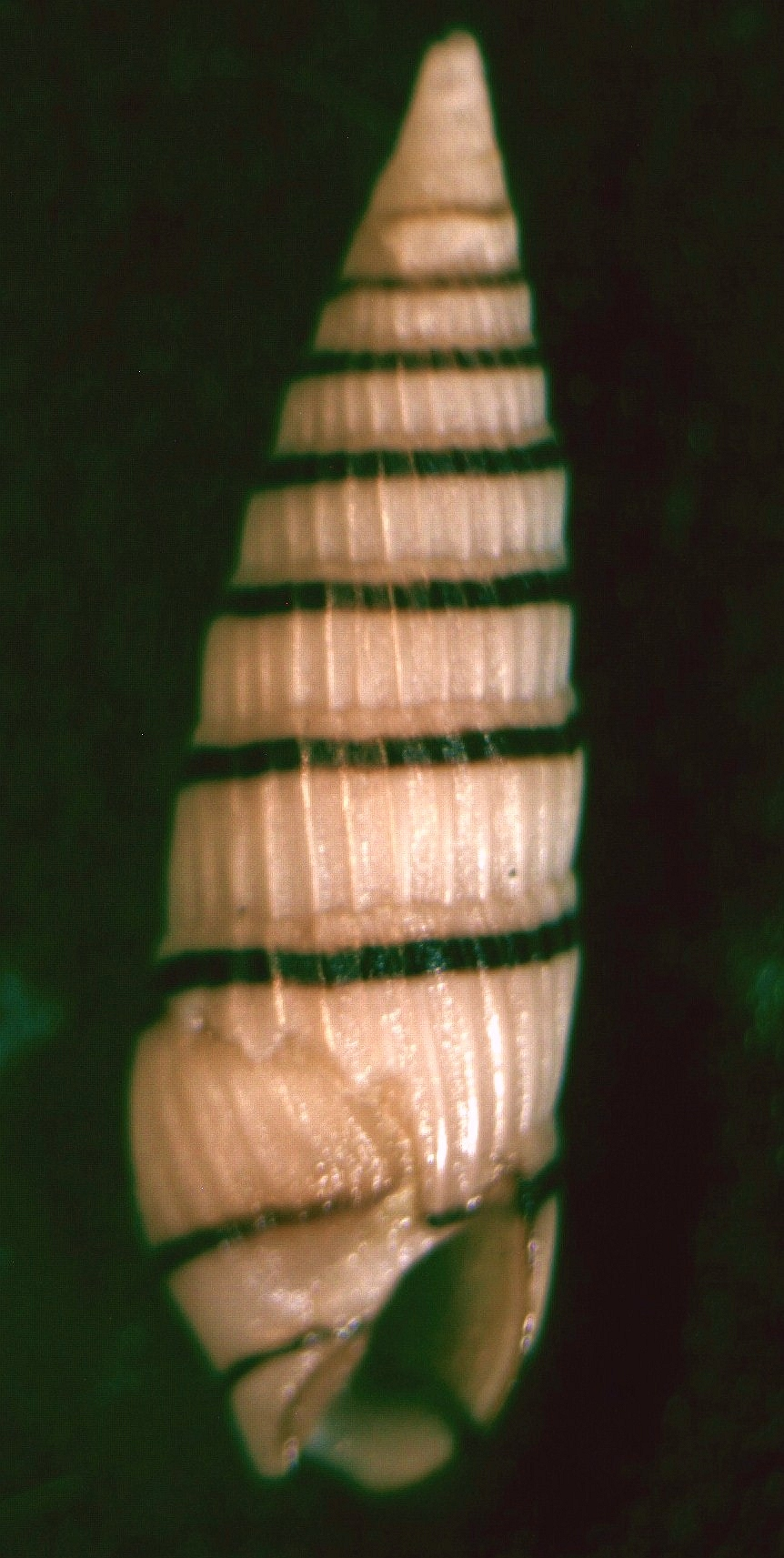
Myurella pygmaea

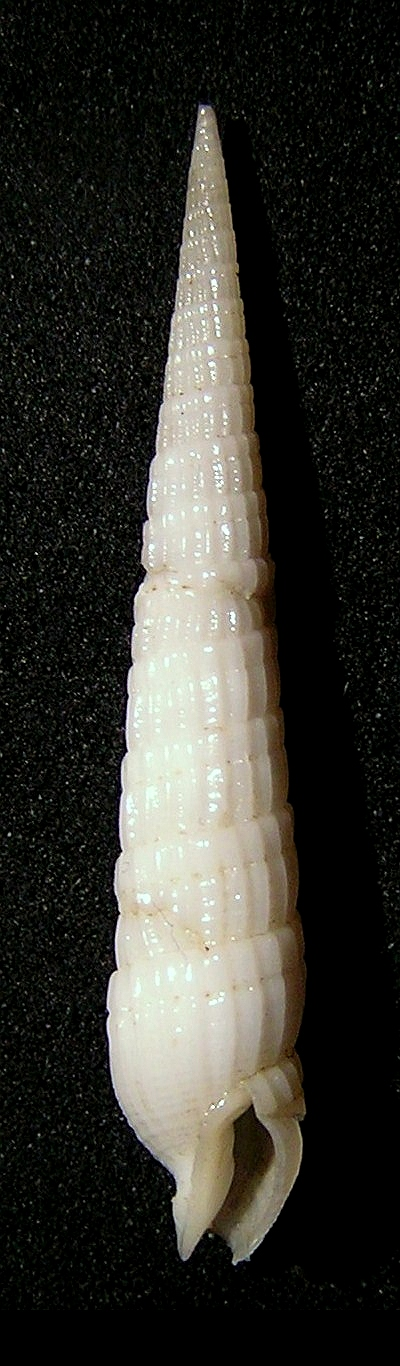
Terebra elliscrossi

Genera brought into synonymy

- Abretia H. Adams & A. Adams, 1853: synonym of Oxymeris Dall, 1903 (invalid: junior homonym of Abretia Rafinesque, 1814; Abretiella is a replacement name)
- Abretiella Bartsch, 1923: synonym of Oxymeris Dall, 1903
- Acuminia Dall, 1908: synonym of Hastula H. Adams & A. Adams, 1853
- Acus Gray, 1847: synonym of Oxymeris Dall, 1903 (invalid: junior homonym of Acus Lacépède, 1803 [Pisces]; Oxymeris is a replacement name)
- Brevimyurella Oyama, 1961: synonym of Punctoterebra Bartsch, 1923
- Cinguloterebra Oyama, 1961: synonym of Terebra Bruguière, 1789
- Clathroterebra Oyama, 1961: synonym of Myurella Hinds, 1845
- Decorihastula Oyama, 1961: synonym of Myurella Hinds, 1844
- Dimidacus Iredale, 1929: synonym of Terebra Bruguière, 1789
- Diplomeriza Dall, 1919: synonym of Duplicaria Dall, 1908
- Egentelaria Rehder, 1980: synonym of Hastula H. Adams & A. Adams, 1853
- Euterebra Cotton & Godfrey, 1932: synonym of Duplicaria Dall, 1908
- Gradaterebra Cotton & Godfrey, 1932: synonym of Euterebra Cotton & Godfrey, 1932
- Hastulina Oyama, 1961: synonym of Hastula H. Adams & A. Adams, 1853
- Impages E. A. Smith, 1873: synonym of Hastula H. Adams & A. Adams, 1853
- Laeviacus Oyama, 1961: synonym of Pristiterebra Oyama, 1961
- Myurellina Bartsch, 1923: synonym of Terebra Bruguière, 1789
- Myurellisca Bartsch, 1923: synonym of Duplicaria Dall, 1908
- Noditerebra Cossmann, 1896 †: synonym of Terebra Bruguière, 1789
- Nototerebra Cotton, 1947: synonym of Oxymeris Dall, 1903
- Panaterebra Olsson, 1967: synonym of Terebra Bruguière, 1789
- Paraterebra Woodring, 1928: synonym of Terebra Bruguière, 1789
- Partecosta Dance & Eames, 1966: synonym of Euterebra Cotton & Godfrey, 1932
- Pervicacia Iredale, 1924: synonym of Duplicaria Dall, 1908
- Subula Schumacher, 1817: synonym of Terebra Bruguière, 1789
- Terebrina Bartsch, 1923: synonym of Terebra Bruguière, 1789 (invalid: junior homonym of Terebrina Rafinesque, 1815; Dimidacus is a replacement name)
- Terebrum Montfort, 1810: synonym of Terebra Bruguière, 1789
- Terenolla Iredale, 1929: synonym of Myurella Hinds, 1845
- Triplostephanus Dall, 1908: synonym of Terebra Bruguière, 1789
- Vertagus Link, 1807: synonym of Terebra Bruguière, 1789
