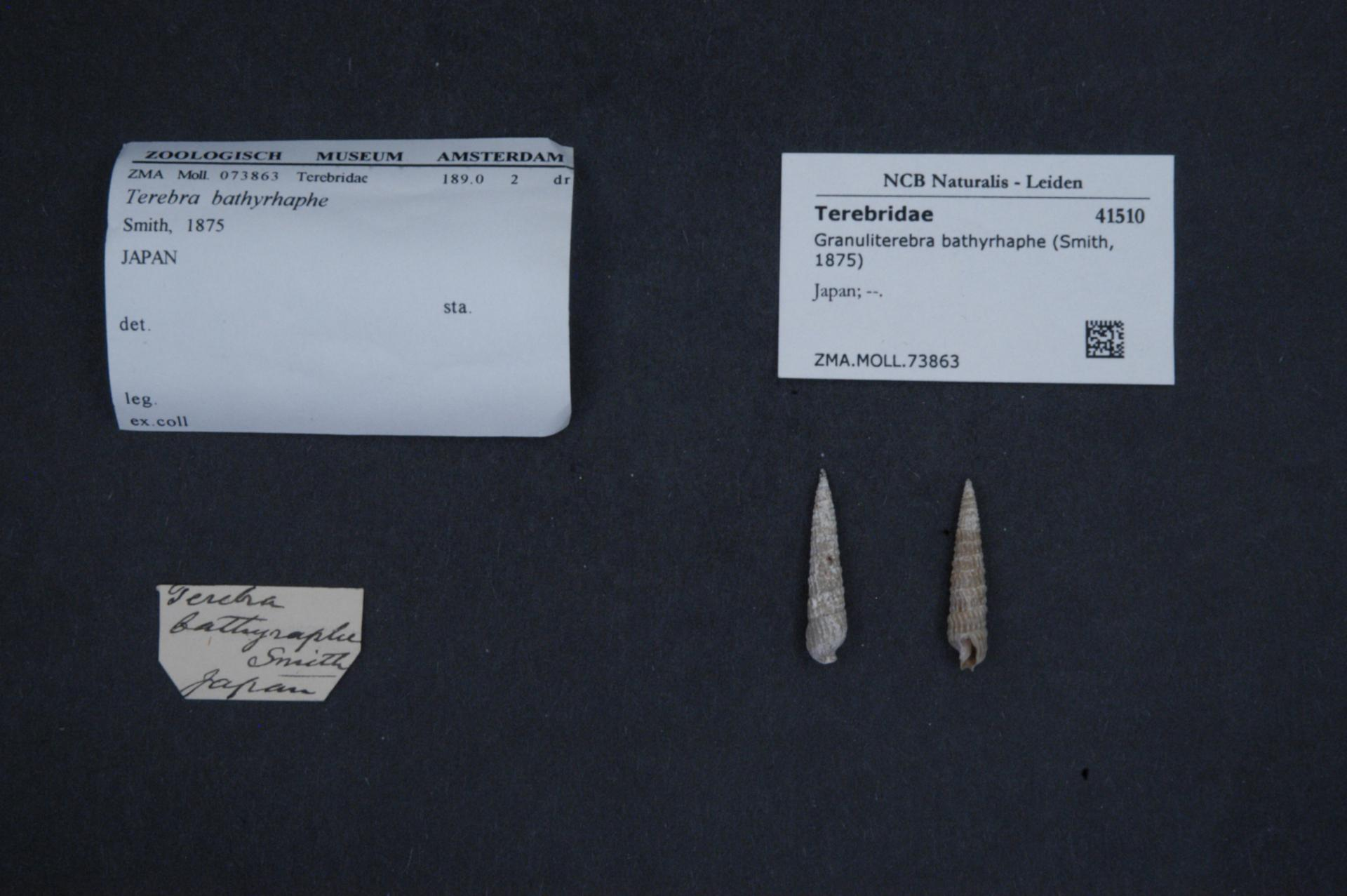
- Granuliterebra bathyrhaphe

Scientific classification
- Kingdom: Animalia
- Phylum: Mollusca
- Class: Gastropoda
- Subclass: Caenogastropoda
- Order: Neogastropoda
- Superfamily: Conoidea
- Family: Terebridae
- Genus: Granuliterebra; Oyama, 1961

Type species
- Terebra bathyrhaphe Smith, 1875

Species
- See text

= Granuliterebra =

Genus of gastropods

Granuliterebra is a genus of sea snails, marine gastropod molluscs in the family Terebridae, the auger snails.

== Species ==
Species within the genus Granuliterebra include:

- Granuliterebra bathyrhaphe (Smith, 1875)
- Granuliterebra constricta (Thiele, 1925)
- Granuliterebra eddunhami Terryn & Holford, 2008
- Granuliterebra oliverai Terryn & Holford, 2008
- Granuliterebra palawanensis (Aubry & Picardal, 2011)
- Granuliterebra persica (Smith, 1877)

Species brought into synonymy

- Granuliterebra castigata (A.H. Cooke, 1885): synonym of Hastulopsis castigata (A. H. Cooke, 1885)
- Granuliterebra tokunagai Oyama & Takemura, 1961: synonym of Granuliterebra tricincta (Smith, 1877)
- Granuliterebra tricincta Smith, 1877: synonym of Duplicaria tricincta (E. A. Smith, 1877)
