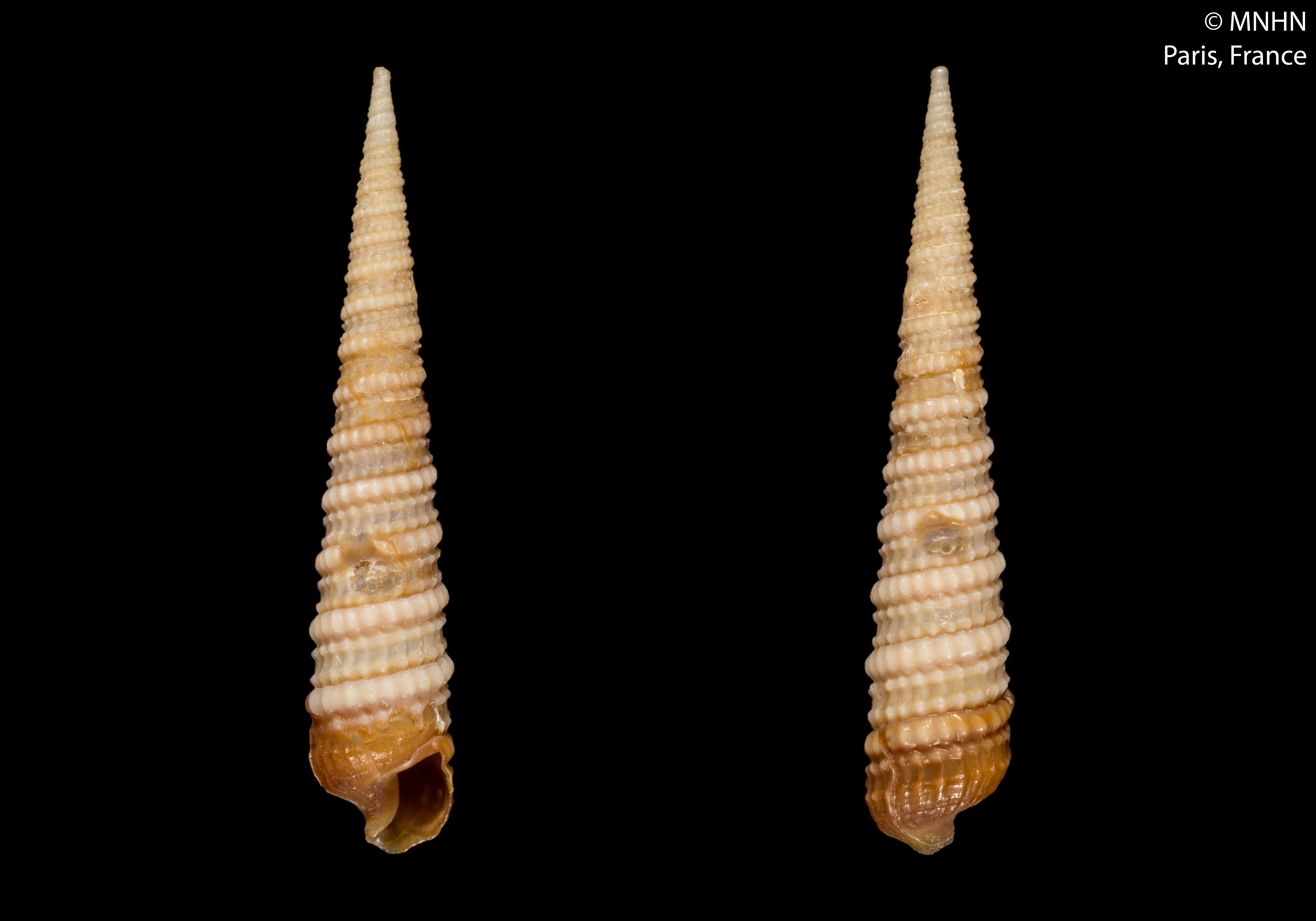
- Shell of Granuliterebra oliverai (holotype at MNHN, Paris)

Scientific classification
- Kingdom: Animalia
- Phylum: Mollusca
- Class: Gastropoda
- Subclass: Caenogastropoda
- Order: Neogastropoda
- Family: Terebridae
- Genus: Granuliterebra
- Species: G. oliverai

Binomial name
- Granuliterebra oliverai Terryn & Holford, 2008

= Granuliterebra oliverai =

Species of gastropod

Granuliterebra oliverai is a species of sea snail, a marine gastropod mollusk in the family Terebridae, the auger snails.

== Description ==
The length of the shell attains 26.3 mm.

== Distribution ==
This marine species occurs off the Philippines.
