= Granuliterebra persica =

Scientific classification
- Kingdom: Animalia
- Phylum: Mollusca
- Class: Gastropoda
- Subclass: Caenogastropoda
- Order: Neogastropoda
- Family: Terebridae
- Genus: Granuliterebra
- Species: G. persica

Binomial name
- Granuliterebra persica (Smith, 1877)

Synonyms
- Terebra persica E. A. Smith, 1877

Species of gastropod

Granuliterebra persica is a species of sea snail, a marine gastropod mollusk in the family Terebridae, the auger snails.
