= Granuliterebra constricta =

Scientific classification
- Kingdom: Animalia
- Phylum: Mollusca
- Class: Gastropoda
- Subclass: Caenogastropoda
- Order: Neogastropoda
- Family: Terebridae
- Genus: Granuliterebra
- Species: G. constricta

Binomial name
- Granuliterebra constricta (Thiele, 1925)

Synonyms
- Terebra constricta Thiele, 1925

Species of sea snail

Granuliterebra constricta is a species of sea snail, a marine gastropod mollusk in the family Terebridae, the auger snails.
