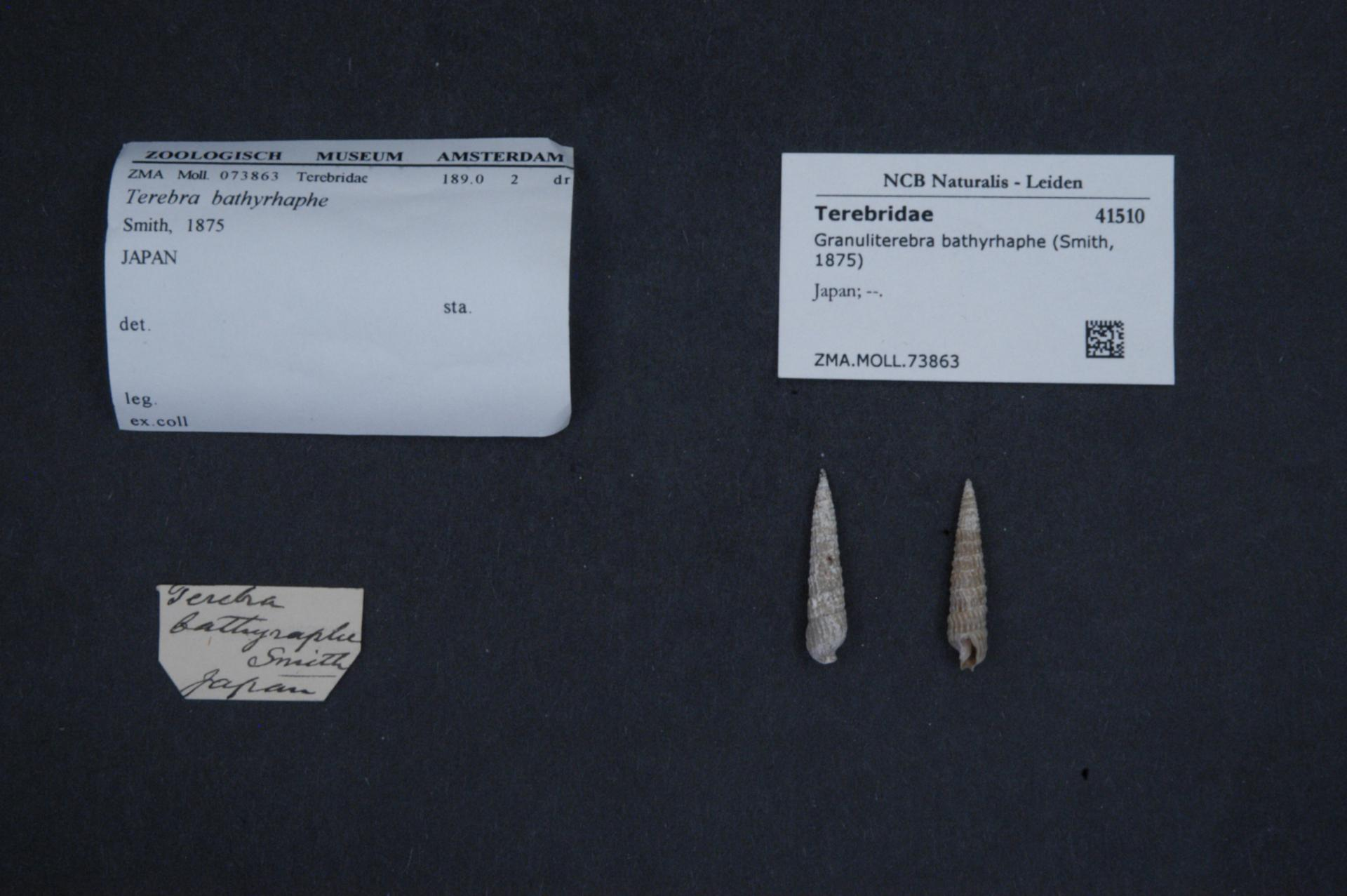

Scientific classification
- Kingdom: Animalia
- Phylum: Mollusca
- Class: Gastropoda
- Subclass: Caenogastropoda
- Order: Neogastropoda
- Family: Terebridae
- Genus: Granuliterebra
- Species: G. bathyrhaphe

Binomial name
- Granuliterebra bathyrhaphe (Campbell, 1961)

Synonyms
- Terebra bathyrhaphe Smith, 1875; Terebra constricta Thiele, 1925; Terebra persica Smith, 1877

= Granuliterebra bathyrhaphe =

Species of gastropod

Granuliterebra bathyrhaphe is a species of sea snail, a marine gastropod mollusk in the family Terebridae, the auger snails.
