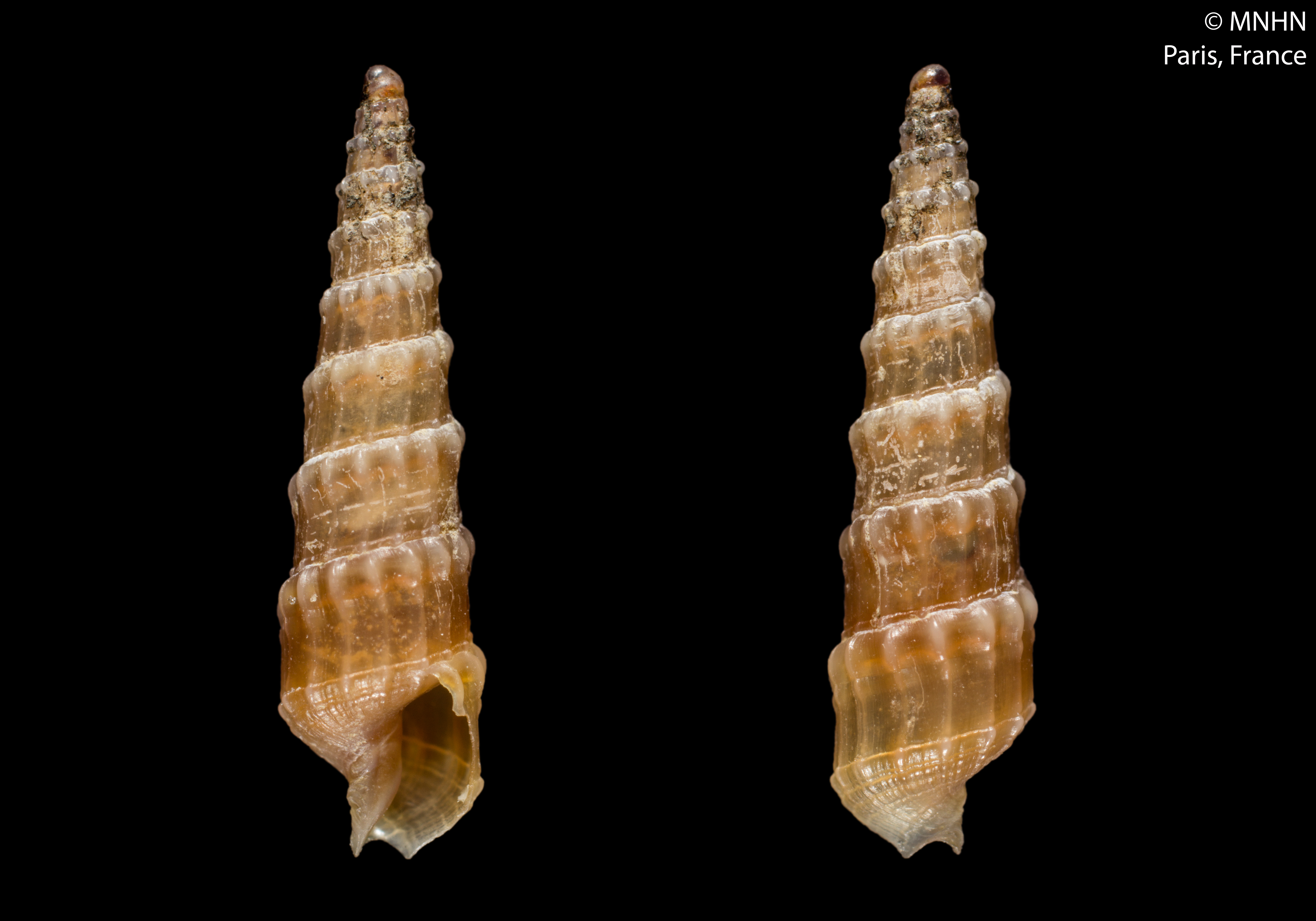
- Shell of Granuliterebra eddunhami (holotype at MNHN, Paris)

Scientific classification
- Kingdom: Animalia
- Phylum: Mollusca
- Class: Gastropoda
- Subclass: Caenogastropoda
- Order: Neogastropoda
- Family: Terebridae
- Genus: Granuliterebra
- Species: G. eddunhami

Binomial name
- Granuliterebra eddunhami Terryn & Holford, 2008

= Granuliterebra eddunhami =

Species of gastropod

Granuliterebra eddunhami is a species of sea snail, a marine gastropod mollusk in the family Terebridae, the auger snails.

== Description ==
The length of the shell attains 9.6 mm.

== Distribution ==
This species occurs in the Indian Ocean off Mozambique.
