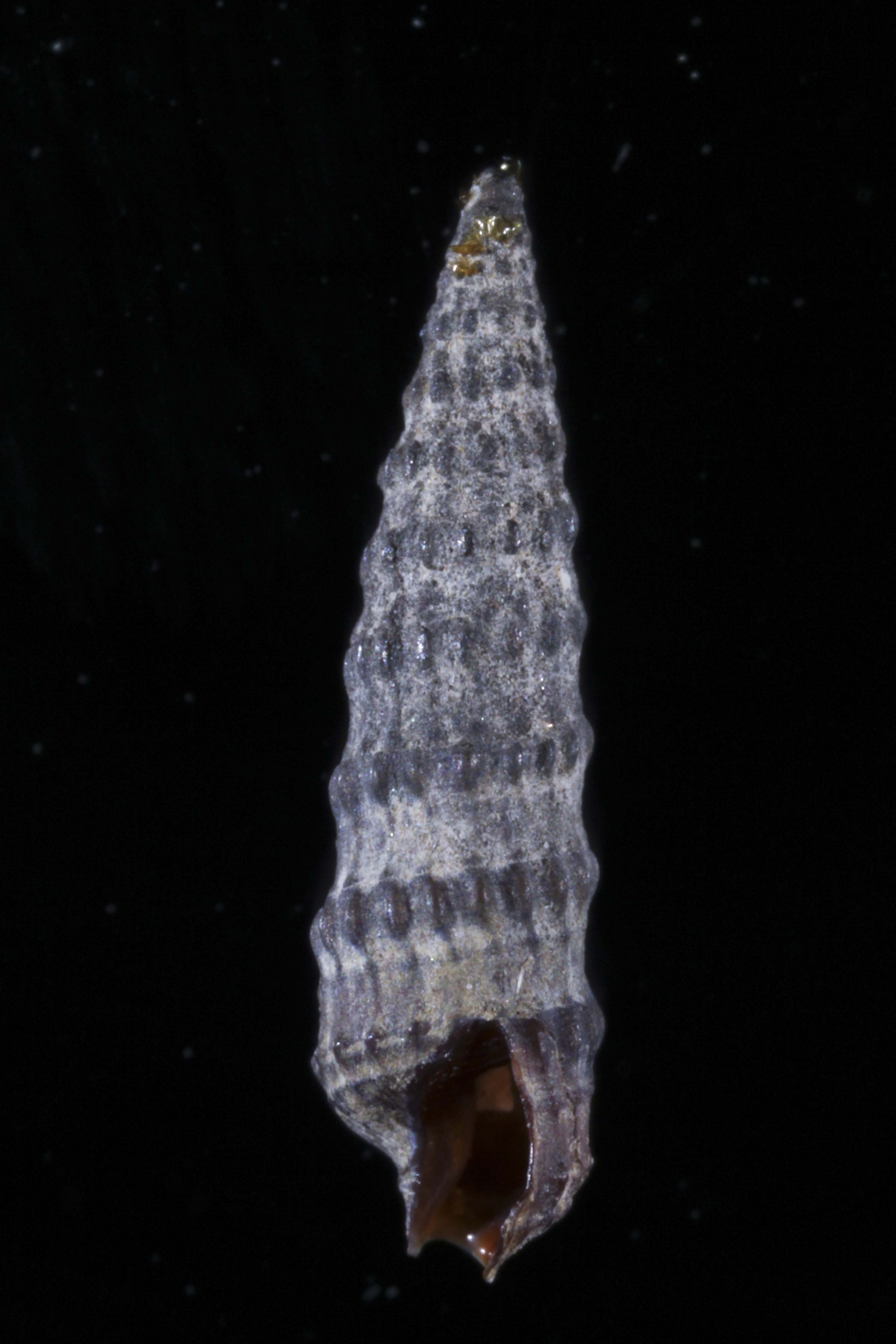
- Shell of Duplicaria tricincta (specimen at MNHN, Paris)

Scientific classification
- Kingdom: Animalia
- Phylum: Mollusca
- Class: Gastropoda
- Subclass: Caenogastropoda
- Order: Neogastropoda
- Family: Terebridae
- Genus: Duplicaria
- Species: D. tricincta

Binomial name
- Duplicaria tricincta (E.A. Smith, 1877)

Synonyms
- Granuliterebra tokunagai Oyama & Takemura, 1961; Granuliterebra tricincta (E. A. Smith, 1877); Terebra tricincta Smith, 1877

= Duplicaria tricincta =

Species of gastropod

Duplicaria tricincta is a species of sea snail, a marine gastropod mollusk in the family Terebridae, the auger snails.

== Distribution ==
It is found in the Persian Gulf. and off Papua New Guinea.
