= T. laevigata =

T. laevigata may refer to:

- Terebra laevigata, a sea snail species
- Turbinella laevigata, the Brazilian chank, a very large sea snail species found in Brazil

== See also ==
- Laevigata
