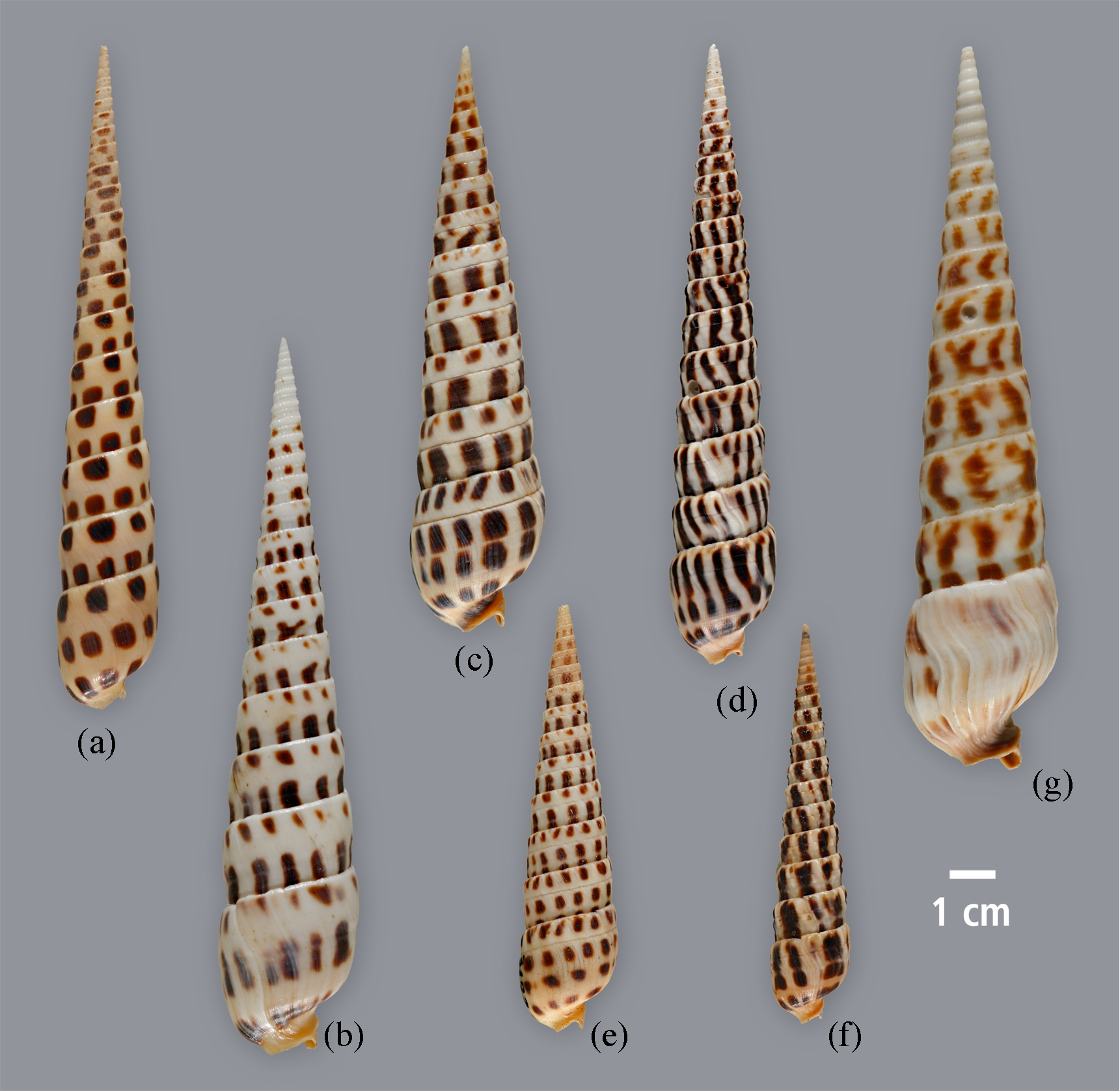
- Terebra spp.

Scientific classification
- Kingdom: Animalia
- Phylum: Mollusca
- Class: Gastropoda
- Subclass: Caenogastropoda
- Order: Neogastropoda
- Superfamily: Conoidea
- Family: Terebridae
- Genus: Terebra; Bruguière, 1789

Type species
- Buccinum subulatum Linnaeus, 1767

Synonyms
- Cinguloterebra Oyama, 1961; Dimidacus Iredale, 1929; Myurellina Bartsch, 1923; Noditerebra Cossmann, 1896; Nototerebra Cotton, 1947; Panaterebra Olsson, 1967; Perirhoe (Dimidacus) Iredale, 1929; Paraterebra Woodring, 1928; Subula Schumacher, 1817; Terebra (Dimidacus) Iredale, 1929; Terebra (Subula) Schumacher, 1817; Terebra (Triplostephanus) Dall, 1908; Terebrina Bartsch, 1923 (Invalid: junior homonym of Terebrina Rafinesque, 1815; Dimidacus is a replacement name); Terebrum Montfort, 1810; Triplostephanus Dall, 1908; Vertagus Link, 1807

= Terebra =

Genus of gastropods

Terebra is a genus of small to large-sized predatory sea snails, marine gastropod molluscs in the subfamily Terebrinae of the family Terebridae, the auger snails.

Species in this genus do not possess a radula.

== Species ==
Species in the genus Terebra include:

- Terebra achates Weaver, 1960
- Terebra adamsii E. A. Smith, 1873
- Terebra agulha Terryn, 2022
- Terebra aikeni Terryn & Welsh, 2020
- Terebra alabaster Terryn, 2022
- Terebra albocancellata Bratcher, 1988
- Terebra albomarginata Deshayes, 1859
- Terebra amanda Hinds, 1844
- Terebra anilis (Röding, 1798)
- Terebra archimedis Deshayes, 1859
- Terebra argosyia Olsson, 1971
- Terebra argus Hinds, 1844
- Terebra babylonia Lamarck, 1822
- Terebra balabacensis Aubry & Picardal, 2011
- Terebra bellanodosaGrabau & S. G. King, 1928
- Terebra binii Aubry, 2014
- Terebra boucheti Bratcher, 1981
- Terebra bratcherae Cernohorsky, 1987
- Terebra caddeyi Bratcher & Cernohorsky, 1982
- Terebra caelata A. Adams & Reeve, 1850
- † Terebra canalis S.V. Wood, 1828
- Terebra castaneostriata Kosuge, 1979
- † Terebra catenifera Tate, 1886
- Terebra caudapotamogalina Terryn, 2022
- Terebra cingulifera Lamarck, 1822
- Terebra circinata Deshayes, 1857
- Terebra cognata Smith, 1877
- Terebra commaculata (Gmelin, 1791)
- Terebra connelli Bratcher & Cernohorsky, 1985
- Terebra consobrina Deshayes, 1857
- Terebra corrugata Lamarck, 1822
- Terebra cossignanii Aubry, 2008
- Terebra cumingii Deshayes, 1857
- † Terebra dahanaensis Icke & K. Martin, 1907
- † Terebra degrangei Peyrot, 1931
- Terebra deshayesii Reeve, 1860
- † Terebra dijki K. Martin, 1884
- Terebra donpisori Terryn, 2017
- Terebra ekotokwa Terryn, 2022
- † Terebra elena Pilsbry & Olsson, 1941
- Terebra elliscrossi Bratcher, 1979
- † Terebra erbi Haanstra & Spiker, 1932
- Terebra erythraeensis Terryn & Dekker, 2017
- † Terebra exilis Bell, 1871
- Terebra eximia Deshayes, 1859
- Terebra fenestrata Hinds, 1844
- Terebra fernandae Aubry, 1991
- Terebra fernandesi Bouchet, 1983
- Terebra fijiensis Smith, 1873
- Terebra floridana (Dall, 1889)
- Terebra formosa Deshayes, 1857
- Terebra fujitai Kuroda & Habe, 1952
- Terebra funiculata Hinds, 1844
- Terebra gabriellae Aubry, 2008
- Terebra gaiae Aubry, 2008
- Terebra giorgioi Aubry, 1999
- Terebra grayi E. A. Smith, 1877
- † Terebra grayi J. A. Gardner, 1948 The name is temporally accepted as an unreplaced junior homonym (junior homonym of Terebra grayi E.A. Smith, 1877)
- Terebra grimwoodi Terryn, 2022
- Terebra guineensis Bouchet, 1983
- Terebra guttata (Röding, 1798)
- Terebra helichrysum Melvill & Standen, 1903
- Terebra histrio Deshayes, 1857
- Terebra hoaraui Drivas & Jay, 1988
- Terebra hochstetteri K. Martin, 1879
- † Terebra holfordae Terryn, 2022
- † Terebra hungarica Halaváts, 1884
- † Terebra ickei K. Martin, 1906
- Terebra insalli Bratcher & Burch, 1976
- † Terebra inversa Nyst, 1843
- Terebra irregularis Thiele, 1925
- Terebra jacksoniana Garrard, 1976
- Terebra jenningsi R. D. Burch, 1965
- Terebra kantori Terryn, 2017
- Terebra knudseni Bratcher, 1983
- Terebra laevigata Gray, 1834
- Terebra lauretanae Tenison-Woods, 1878
- Terebra levantina Aubry, 1999
- Terebra ligata Hinds, 1844
- Terebra lillianae Withney, 1976
- Terebra lima Deshayes, 1857
- Terebra lindae Petuch, 1987
- Terebra luandensis Aubry, 2008
- Terebra luteatincta Terryn & Keppens, 2023
- Terebra mamillata R. B. Watson, 1886
- Terebra mariesi E. A. Smith, 1880
- Terebra marrowae Bratcher & Cernohorsky, 1982
- Terebra montgomeryi Burch, 1965
- Terebra moolenbeeki Aubry, 1995
- Terebra neglecta (Poppe, Tagaro & Terryn, 2009)
- † Terebra niauensis Tröndlé & Letourneux, 2011
- Terebra nodularis Deshayes, 1859
- Terebra noumeaensis Aubry, 1999
- Terebra ornata Gray, 1834
- Terebra pellyi Smith, 1877
- Terebra picta Hinds, 1844
- Terebra polygonia Reeve, 1860
- Terebra praelonga Deshayes, 1859
- Terebra pretiosa Reeve, 1842
- † Terebra pseudopertusa Peyrot, 1931
- Terebra pseudopicta Aubry, 2008
- Terebra pseudoturbonilla Talavera, 1975
- Terebra punctatostriata Gray, 1834
- Terebra punctum (Poppe, Tagaro & Terryn, 2009)
- Terebra quoygaimardi Cernohorsky, 1987 & Bratcher, 1976
- Terebra raybaudii (Aubry, 1993)
- Terebra reticularis (Pecchioli in Sacco, 1891)
- Terebra robusta Hinds, 1844
- Terebra rosae Aubry, 2015
- Terebra russetae (Garrard, 1976)
- Terebra salisburyi Drivas & Jay, 1998
- † Terebra samarangana K. Martin, 1884
- †Terebra santosi (Shuto, 1969)
- † Terebra shimajiriensis MacNeil, 1961
- † Terebra sindangbaranensis K. Martin, 1906
- † Terebra sokkohensis K. Martin, 1916
- Terebra spraguei Terryn, 2022
- Terebra stearnsii Pilsbry, 1891
- Terebra straminea Gray, 1834
- Terebra subacuminata H. Woodward, 1879
- † Terebra subangulata Deshayes, 1859
- Terebra subulata (Linnaeus, 1767)
- Terebra succinea Hinds, 1844
- Terebra swobodai Bratcher, 1981
- Terebra tagaroae Terryn, 2017
- Terebra taiwanensis Aubry, 1999
- Terebra takauensis Terryn, 2021
- † Terebra talahabensis K. Martin, 1906
- Terebra taurina (Lightfoot, 1786) - flame auger
- † Terebra telegdi Finlay, 1927
- † Terebra tenisoni Finlay, 1927
- Terebra terryni Poppe, Tagaro & Goto, 2018
- † Terebra teschi Finlay, 1930
- Terebra tessellata Gray, 1834
- † Terebra tjidamarensis K. Martin, 1880
- Terebra tricolor Sowerby I, 1825
- Terebra triseriata Gray, 1834
- Terebra twilae Bouchet, 1982
- † Terebra undulifera G. B. Sowerby I, 1846
- Terebra unicolor Preston, 1908
- Terebra vanuatuensis Aubry, 1999
- Terebra vanwalleghemi Terryn, 2017
- Terebra vappereaui Tröndlé, Boutet & Terryn, 2013
- Terebra venilia Tenison-Woods, 1880
- Terebra vicdani Kosuge, 1981
- Terebra virgo Schepman, 1913
- † Terebra vredenburgi Finlay, 1930
- Terebra waikikiensis Pilsbry, 1921
- † Terebra waisiuensis K. Martin, 1933

Nomen dubium

- Terebra bicincta Hinds, 1844
- Terebra dispar Deshayes, 1859
- Terebra tuberosa Hinds, 1844
- Terebra violascens Hinds, 1844

Uncertain status

- Terebra walkeri Smith, 1899 (is a species of Cerithiidae)

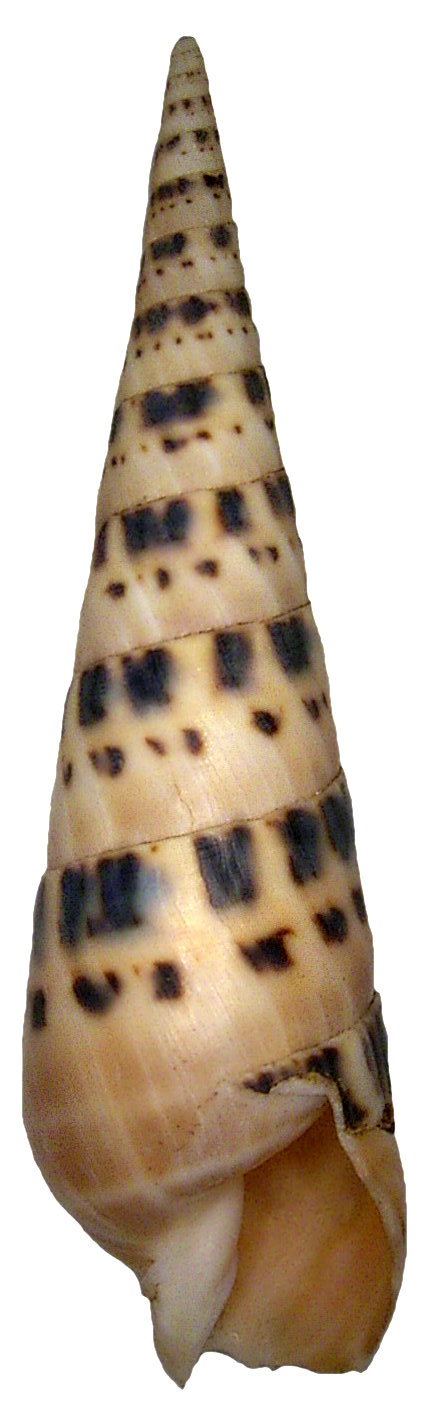
Terebra maculata shell

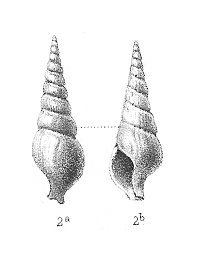
Terebra inversa, a fossil gastropod from Pliocene deposits near Antwerp.

== Synonyms ==
This list is incomplete

- Terebra aciculina Reeve, 1860: synonym of Hastula aciculina (Lamarck, 1822) (original combination)
- Terebra acrior Dall, 1889: synonym of Neoterebra acrior (Dall, 1889)
- Terebra affinis Gray, 1834: synonym of Myurella affinis (Gray, 1834)
- Terebra alagoensis De Lima, Tenorio & De Barros, 2007: synonym of Neoterebra alagoensis (S. Lima, Tenorio & Barros, 2007)
- Terebra alba Gray, 1834: synonym of Neoterebra alba (Gray, 1834)
- Terebra alisi Aubry, 1999: synonym of Myurellopsis alisi (Aubry, 1999)
- Terebra allyni Bratcher & Burch, 1970: synonym of Neoterebra allyni (Bratcher & R. D. Burch, 1970)
- Terebra alveolata Hinds, 1844: synonym of Maculauger alveolatus (Hinds, 1844)
- Terebra ambrosia Melvill, 1912: synonym of Punctoterebra polygyrata (Deshayes, 1859)
- Terebra anseeuwi Terryn, 2005: synonym of Profunditerebra anseeuwi (Terryn, 2005)
- Terebra arabella Thiele, 1925: synonym of Punctoterebra arabella (Thiele, 1925)
- Terebra arcas Abbott, 1954 - Arcas auger: synonym of Neoterebra arcas (Abbott, 1954)
- Terebra armillata Hinds, 1844: synonym of Neoterebra armillata (Hinds, 1844)
- Terebra assimilis Pease, 1869: synonym of Punctoterebra plumbea (Quoy & Gaimard, 1833)
- Terebra assu Simone, 2012: synonym of Neoterebra assu (Simone, 2012)
- Terebra aubryi Gargiulo & Terryn, 2018: synonym of Punctoterebra aubryi (Gargiulo & Terryn, 2018)
- Terebra awajiensis Pilsbry, 1904: synonym of Punctoterebra awajiensis (Pilsbry, 1904)
- Terebra ballina (Hedley, 1915): synonym of Punctoterebra ballina (Hedley, 1915)
- Terebra barbieri Aubry, 2008: synonym of Oxymeris barbieri (Aubry, 2008) (original combination)
- Terebra benthalis Dall, 1889: synonym of Duplicaria benthalis (Dall, 1889)
- Terebra bermonti Lorois, 1857: synonym of Punctoterebra succincta (Gmelin, 1791)
- Terebra berryi Campbell, 1961: synonym of Neoterebra berryi (G. B. Campbell, 1961)
- Terebra bifrons Hinds, 1844: synonym of Pristiterebra bifrons (Hinds, 1844)
- Terebra biminiensis (Petuch, 1987): synonym of Neoterebra biminiensis (Petuch, 1987)
- Terebra bourguignati Deshayes, 1859: synonym of Punctoterebra plumbea (Quoy & Gaimard, 1833)
- Terebra brandi Bratcher & Burch, 1970: synonym of Neoterebra brandi (Bratcher & R. D. Burch, 1970)
- Terebra brasiliensis (Smith, 1873): synonym of Neoterebra brasiliensis (E. A. Smith, 1873)
- Terebra brianhayesi Terryn & Sprag, 2008: synonym of Pellifronia brianhayesi (Terryn & Sprague, 2008)
- Terebra bridgesi Dall, 1908: synonym of Neoterebra bridgesi (Dall, 1908)
- Terebra caliginosa Deshayes, 1859: synonym of Punctoterebra caliginosa (Deshayes, 1859)
- Terebra campbelli R. D. Burch, 1965: synonym of Maculauger campbelli (R. D. Burch, 1965)
- Terebra cancellata Gray, 1834: synonym of Terebra cancellata Quoy & Gaimard, 1833
- Terebra cancellata Quoy & Gaimard, 1833: synonym of Punctoterebra succincta (Gmelin, 1791)
- Terebra capensis (E. A. Smith, 1873): synonym of Gradaterebra capensis (E. A. Smith, 1873)
- Terebra carolae Bratcher, 1979: synonym of Neoterebra carolae (Bratcher, 1979)
- Terebra casta Hinds, 1844: synonym of Hastula casta (Hinds, 1844)
- Terebra castaneofusca Thiele, 1925: synonym of Punctoterebra castaneofusca (Thiele, 1925)
- Terebra castigata A. H. Cooke, 1885: synonym of Maculauger castigatus (A. H. Cooke, 1885)
- Terebra cerithina Lamarck, 1822: synonym of Oxymeris cerithina (Lamarck, 1822)
- Terebra cernica Sowerby III, 1894: synonym of Punctoterebra nitida (Hinds, 1844)
- Terebra churea Campbell, 1964: synonym of Neoterebra churea (G. B. Campbell, 1964)
- Terebra cinctella Deshayes, 1859: synonym of Maculauger cinctellus (Deshayes, 1859)
- Terebra cinerea (Born, 1778): synonym of Hastula cinerea (Born, 1778)
- Terebra circumcincta Deshayes, 1857 is a synonym for Perirhoe circumcincta (Deshayes, 1857)
- Terebra clappi Pilsbry, 1921: synonym of Punctoterebra plumbea (Quoy & Gaimard, 1833)
- Terebra colombiensis Simone & Gracia, 2006: synonym of Neoterebra colombiensis (Simone & Gracia, 2006)
- Terebra colorata Bratcher, 1988: synonym of Hastula colorata Bratcher, 1988 (taxon inquirendum)
- Terebra concava (Say, 1826): synonym of Neoterebra concava (Say, 1826) - concave auger
- Terebra consors Hinds, 1844: synonym of Oxymeris consors (Hinds, 1844)
- Terebra contigua Pease, 1871: synonym of Punctoterebra plumbea (Quoy & Gaimard, 1833)
- Terebra contracta (Smith, 1873): synonym of Punctoterebra contracta (E. A. Smith, 1873)
- Terebra corintoensis Pilsbry & Lowe, 1932: synonym ofNeoterebra corintoensis (Pilsbry & Lowe, 1932)
- Terebra crassireticula (Lopes de Simone, 1999): synonym of Neoterebra crassireticula (Lopes de Simone, 1999)
- Terebra crassireticulata (Lopes de Simone & Verissimo, 1995): synonym of Terebra crassireticula Simone, 1999
- Terebra crenifera Deshayes, 1859: synonym of Neoterebra crenifera (Deshayes, 1859) - western crenate auger
- Terebra crenulata (Linnaeus, 1758): synonym of Acus crenulata
- Terebra daniae Aubry, 2008: synonym of Hastula daniae (Aubry, 2008)
- Terebra dislocata (Say, 1822): synonym of Neoterebra dislocata (Say, 1822) - eastern auger
- Terebra doellojuradoi Carcelles, 1953: synonym of Neoterebra doellojuradoi (Carcelles, 1953)
- Terebra duplicata (Linnaeus, 1758): synonym of Duplicaria duplicata (Linnaeus, 1758)
- Terebra dussumierii Kiener, 1839: synonym of Duplicaria dussumierii (Kiener, 1839)
- Terebra edgarii Melvill, 1898: synonym of Duplicaria spectabilis (Hinds, 1844)
- Terebra efatensis Aubry, 1999: synonym of Teremitra efatensis (Aubry, 1999)
- Terebra elata Hinds, 1844: synonym of Neoterebra elata (Hinds, 1844)
- Terebra evelynae Clench & Aguayo, 1939: synonym of Profunditerebra evelynae (Clench & Aguayo, 1939)
- Terebra evoluta Deshayes, 1859: synonym of Duplicaria evoluta (Deshayes, 1859)
- Terebra exigua Deshayes, 1859: synonym of Punctoterebra textilis (Hinds, 1844)
- Terebra exiguoides Schepman, 1913: synonym of Punctoterebra exiguoides (Schepman, 1913)
- Terebra fenestrata Hinds, 1844: synonym of Triplostephanus fenestratus Hinds, 1844)
- Terebra flavescens Deshayes, 1859: synonym of Punctoterebra succincta (Gmelin, 1791)
- Terebra flavofasciata Pilsbry, 1921: synonym of Myurella flavofasciata (Pilsbry, 1921)
- Terebra frigata Hinds, 1844: synonym of Neoterebra frigata (Hinds, 1844)
- Terebra fuscotaeniata Thiele, 1925: synonym of Punctoterebra fuscotaeniata (Thiele, 1925)
- Terebra glossema Schwengel, 1942: synonym of Neoterebra glossema (Schwengel, 1942) - tongue auger
- Terebra guayaquilensis (Smith, 1880): synonym of Neoterebra guayaquilensis (Smith, 1880)
- Terebra guphilae Poppe, Tagaro & Terryn, 2009: synonym of Myurellopsis guphilae (Poppe, Tagaro & Terryn, 2009)
- Terebra hancocki Bratcher & Burch, 1970: synonym of Neoterebra hancocki (Bratcher & Burch, 1970)
- Terebra hemphilli Vanatta, 1924: synonym of Neoterebra hemphilli (Vanatta, 1924)
- Terebra hiscocki Sprague, 2004: synonym of Profunditerebra hiscocki (Sprague, 2004)
- Terebra hizenensis Pilsbry, 1904: synonym of Punctoterebra textilis (Hinds, 1844)
- Terebra hoffmeyeri Abbott, 1952: synonym of Punctoterebra plumbea (Quoy & Gaimard, 1833)
- Terebra incisa Faber, 2007: synonym of Neoterebra incisa (Faber, 2007)
- Terebra inflexa Pease, 1869: synonym of Punctoterebra swainsoni (Deshayes, 1859)
- Terebra intertincta Hinds, 1844: synonym of Neoterebra intertincta (Hinds, 1844)
- Terebra intumescyra De Lima, Tenorio & De Barros, 2007: synonym of Neoterebra intumescyra (S. Lima, Tenorio & Barros, 2007)
- Terebra isabella Thiele, 1925: synonym of Punctoterebra isabella (Thiele, 1925)
- * Terebra jacquelinae Bratcher & Burch, 1970: synonym of Neoterebra jacquelinae (Bratcher & Burch, 1970)
- Terebra japonica E. A. Smith, 1873: synonym of Punctoterebra japonica (E. A. Smith, 1873)
- Terebra juanica Dall & Simpson, 1901: synonym of Neoterebra juanica (Dall & Simpson, 1901)
- Terebra jungi Lai, 2001: synonym of Pellifronia jungi (Lai, 2001)
- Terebra kilburni R.D. Burch, 1965: synonym of Myurella kilburni (R.D. Burch, 1965)
- Terebra lamyi Terryn, 2011: synonym of Neoterebra lamyi (Terryn, 2011)
- Terebra lanceata Reeve, 1860: synonym of Hastula lanceata (Linnaeus, 1767)
- Terebra larvaeformis Hinds, 1844: synonym of Neoterebra larvaeformis (Hinds, 1844)
- Terebra leptapsis Simone, 1999: synonym of Neoterebra leptapsis (Simone, 1999)
- Terebra limatula Dall, 1889: synonym of Neoterebra limatula (Dall, 1889)
- Terebra lischkeana Dunker, 1877: synonym of Punctoterebra lischkeana (Dunker, 1877)
- Terebra livida Reeve, 1860: synonym of Punctoterebra livida (Reeve, 1860)
- Terebra longiscata Deshayes, 1859: synonym of Punctoterebra longiscata (Deshayes, 1859)
- Terebra lucana Dall, 1908: synonym of Neoterebra lucana (Dall, 1908)
- Terebra matheroniana Deshayes, 1859: synonym of Hastula matheroniana (Deshayes, 1859)
- Terebra mediapacifica: synonym of Hastula albula (Menke, 1843)
- Terebra mindanaoensis Aubry, 2008: synonym of Myurella mindanaoensis (Aubry, 2008)
- Terebra mugridgeae García, 1999: synonym of Neoterebra mugridgeae (García, 1999)
- Terebra nadinae Aubry, 2008: synonym of Duplicaria nadinae (Aubry, 2008)
- Terebra nassula Dall, 1889: synonym of Neoterebra nassula (Dall, 1889) - woven auger
- Terebra nathaliae (Drivas & Jay, 1988): synonym of Myurellopsis nathaliae (Drivas & Jay, 1988)
- Terebra nebulosa Sowerby I, 1825: synonym of Myurella nebulosa (Sowerby I, 1825)
- Terebra ningaloensis Aubry, 1999: synonym of Myurella ningaloensis (Aubry, 1999)
- Terebra ninfae Campbell, 1961: synonym of Gradaterebra ninfae (Campbell, 1961)
- Terebra nitida Hinds, 1844: synonym of Strioterebrum nitidum (Hinds, 1844)
- Terebra oculata Lamarck, 1822: synonym of Terebra guttata (Röding, 1798)
- Terebra omanensis Gargiulo, 2018: synonym of Profunditerebra omanensis (Gargiulo, 2018)
- Terebra orientalis Aubry, 1999: synonym of Profunditerebra orientalis (Aubry, 1999)
- Terebra pacei Petuch, 1987: synonym of Neoterebra pacei (Petuch, 1987)
- Terebra panamensis Dall, 1908: synonym of Neoterebra panamensis (Dall, 1908)
- Terebra paucincisa Bratcher, 1988: synonym of Punctoterebra paucincisa (Bratcher, 1988)
- Terebra pedroana Dall, 1908: synonym of Neoterebra pedroana (Dall, 1908)
- Terebra penicillata Hinds, 1844: synonym of Hastula penicillata (Hinds, 1844)
- Terebra pertusa (Born, 1778): synonym of Myurella pertusa (Born, 1778)
- Terebra plicata Gray, 1834: synonym of Neoterebra plicata (Gray, 1834)
- Terebra plicatella Deshayes, 1857: synonym of Punctoterebra nitida (Hinds, 1844)
- Terebra plumbea Quoy & Gaimard, 1833: synonym of Punctoterebra plumbea (Quoy & Gaimard, 1833)
- Terebra polygyrata Deshayes, 1859: synonym of Punctoterebra polygyrata (Deshayes, 1859)
- Terebra polypenus Pilsbry & Lowe, 1932: synonym of Microtrypetes polypenus (Pilsbry & Lowe, 1932)
- Terebra poppei Terryn, 2003: synonym of Profunditerebra poppei (Terryn, 2003)
- Terebra protexta (Conrad, 1846): synonym of Neoterebra protexta (Conrad, 1846)
- Terebra pseudofortunei Aubry, 2008: synonym of Myurella pseudofortunei (Aubry, 2008)
- Terebra punctata Gray, 1834: synonym of Terebra corrugata Lamarck, 1822
- Terebra rancheria Bratcher, 1988: synonym of Neoterebra rancheria (Bratcher, 1988)
- Terebra raphanula Lamarck, 1822: synonym of Hastula raphanula (Lamarck, 1822)
- Terebra remanalva Melvill, 1910: synonym of Duplicaria spectabilis (Hinds, 1844)
- Terebra roperi Pilsbry & Lowe, 1932: synonym of Neoterebra roperi (Pilsbry & Lowe, 1932)
- Terebra rosacea Pease, 1869: synonym of Punctoterebra rosacea (Pease, 1869)
- Terebra roseata A. Adams & Reeve, 1850: synonym of Punctoterebra roseata (A. Adams & Reeve, 1850)
- Terebra rushii Dall, 1889: synonym of Neoterebra rushii (Dall, 1889) - porcelain auger
- Terebra sandrinae Aubry, 2008: synonym of Partecosta sandrinae (Aubry, 2008)
- Terebra sanjuanensis Pilsbry & H. N. Lowe, 1932: synonym of Neoterebra sanjuanensis (Pilsbry & H. N. Lowe, 1932)
- Terebra shyana Bratcher & Burch, 1970: synonym of Neoterebra shyana (Bratcher & Burch, 1970)
- Terebra simonei De Lima, Tenorio & De Barros, 2007: synonym of Neoterebra simonei (De Lima, Tenorio & De Barros, 2007)
- Terebra sorrentensis Aubry, 1999: synonym of Gradaterebra sorrentensis (Aubry, 1999)
- Terebra souleyeti Deshayes, 1859: synonym of Punctoterebra souleyeti (Deshayes, 1859)
- Terebra spirosulcata Simone, 1999: synonym of Neoterebra spirosulcata (Simone, 1999)
- Terebra sterigma Simone, 1999: synonym of Neoterebra sterigma (Simone, 1999)
- Terebra sterigmoides Simone & Gracia, 2006: synonym of Neoterebra sterigmoides (Simone & Gracia, 2006)
- Terebra stohleri Bratcher & Burch, 1970: synonym of Neoterebra stohleri (Bratcher & Burch, 1970)
- Terebra subtextilis E. A. Smith, 1879: synonym of Punctoterebra textilis (Hinds, 1844)
- Terebra subulata Lamarck, 1816 synonym of Terebra areolata A. Adams & Reeve, 1850, itself a synonym of Myurella kilburni (Burch, 1965)
- Terebra succincta (Gmelin, 1791): synonym of Punctoterebra succincta (Gmelin, 1791)
- Terebra swainsoni Deshayes, 1859: synonym of Punctoterebra swainsoni (Deshayes, 1859)
- Terebra thaanumi Pilsbry, 1921: synonym of Acus thaanumi (Pilsbry, 1921)
- Terebra tenuis Li, 1930 †: synonym of Pristiterebra tuberculosa (Hinds, 1844)
- Terebra textilis Hinds, 1844: synonym of Punctoterebra textilis (Hinds, 1844)
- Terebra tiarella Deshayes, 1857: synonym of Neoterebra tiarella (Deshayes, 1857)
- Terebra tiurensis Schepman, 1913: synonym of Punctoterebra tiurensis (Schepman, 1913)
- Terebra tricincta Smith, 1877: synonym of Duplicaria tricincta (E. A. Smith, 1877)
- Terebra trismacaria Melvill, 1917: synonym of Punctoterebra trismacaria (Melvill, 1917)
- Terebra turrita (E. A. Smith, 1873): synonym of Punctoterebra turrita (E. A. Smith, 1873)
- Terebra turschi Bratcher, 1981: synonym of Punctoterebra turschi (Bratcher, 1981)
- Terebra undatella Deshayes, 1859: synonym of Punctoterebra succincta (Gmelin, 1791)
- Terebra undulata Gray, 1834;: synonym of Myurella undulata (Gray, 1834)
- Terebra variegata Gray, 1834: synonym of Neoterebra variegata (Gray, 1834)
- Terebra vaubani Aubry, 1999: synonym of Myurellopsis vaubani (Aubry, 1999)
- Terebra veliae Aubry, 1991: synonym of Partecosta veliae (Aubry, 1991)
- Terebra vinosa Dall, 1889: synonym of Neoterebra vinosa (Dall, 1889) - lilac auger
- Terebra zebra Kiener, 1837: synonym of Oxymeris strigata (G. B. Sowerby I, 1825)
