= Terebra histrio =

Scientific classification
- Kingdom: Animalia
- Phylum: Mollusca
- Class: Gastropoda
- Subclass: Caenogastropoda
- Order: Neogastropoda
- Family: Terebridae
- Genus: Terebra
- Species: T. histrio

Binomial name
- Terebra histrio Deshayes, 1857

Species of gastropod

Terebra histrio is a species of sea snail, a marine gastropod mollusc in the family Terebridae, the auger snails.
