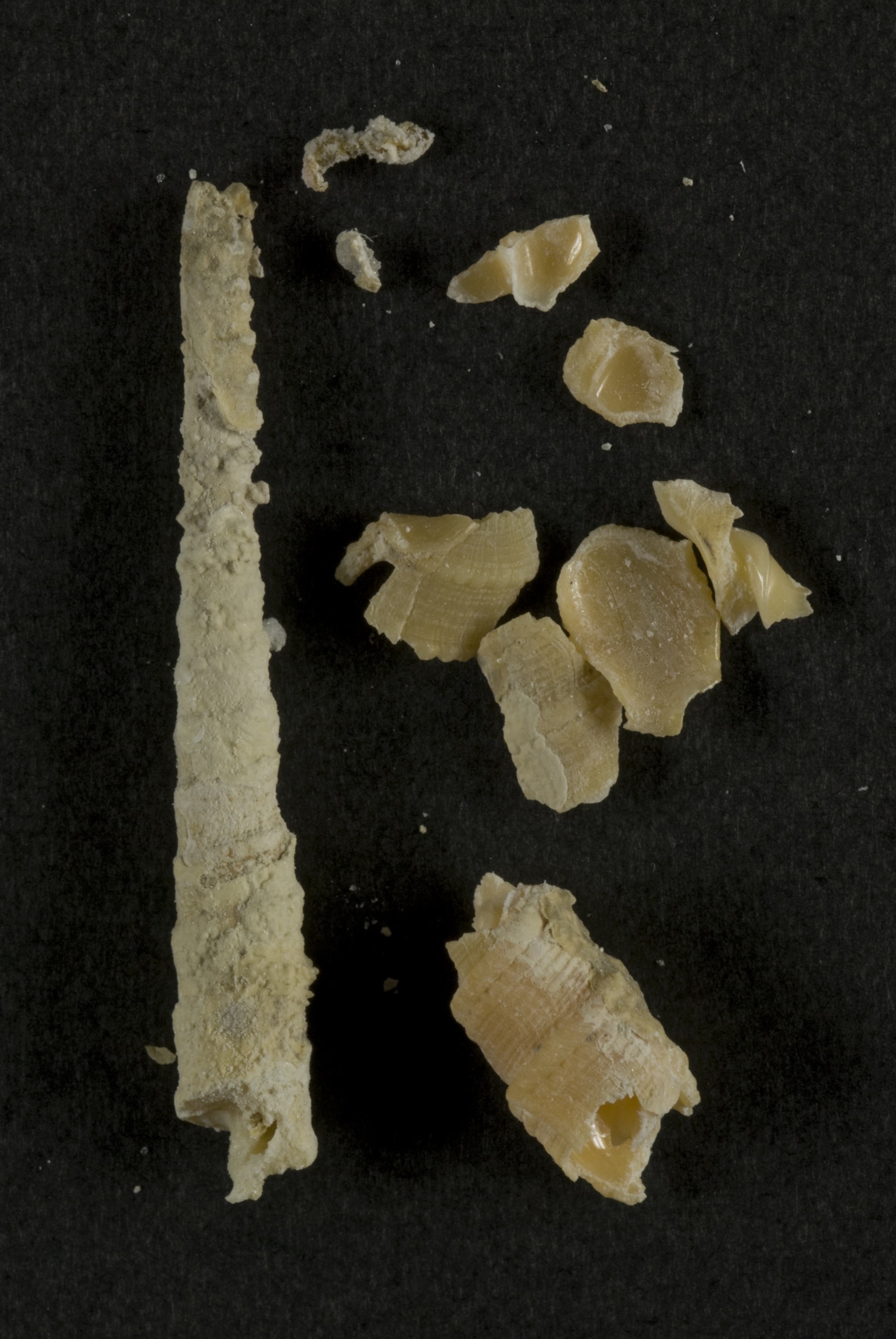
- Shell of Terebra jenningsi (specimen at MNHN, Paris)

Scientific classification
- Kingdom: Animalia
- Phylum: Mollusca
- Class: Gastropoda
- Subclass: Caenogastropoda
- Order: Neogastropoda
- Family: Terebridae
- Genus: Terebra
- Species: T. jenningsi

Binomial name
- Terebra jenningsi Burch, 1965

Synonyms
- Cinguloterebra jenningsi (Burch, 1965)

= Terebra jenningsi =

Species of gastropod

Terebra jenningsi is a species of sea snail, a marine gastropod mollusc in the family Terebridae, the auger snails.

== Distribution ==
This marine species occurs off Papua New Guinea.
