= Terebra waikikiensis =

Scientific classification
- Kingdom: Animalia
- Phylum: Mollusca
- Class: Gastropoda
- Subclass: Caenogastropoda
- Order: Neogastropoda
- Family: Terebridae
- Genus: Terebra
- Species: T. waikikiensis

Binomial name
- Terebra waikikiensis Pilsbry, 1921

Synonyms
- Cinguloterebra waikikiensis (Pilsbry, 1921); Triplostephanus waikikiensis (Pilsbry, 1921)

Species of gastropod

Terebra waikikiensis is a species of sea snail, a marine gastropod mollusc in the family Terebridae, the auger snails.
