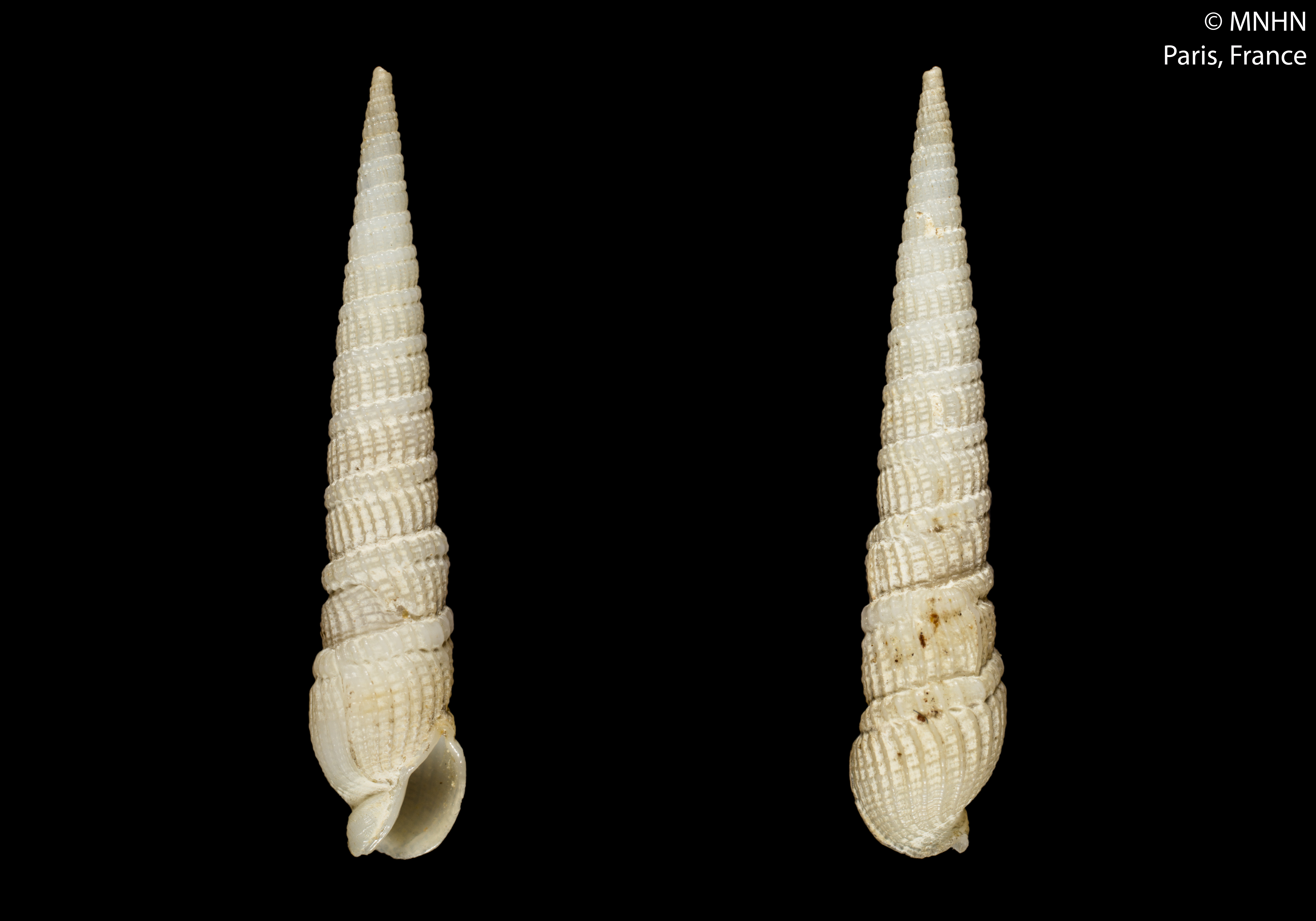
- Shell of Terebra albocancellata (holotype at MNHN, Paris)

Scientific classification
- Kingdom: Animalia
- Phylum: Mollusca
- Class: Gastropoda
- Subclass: Caenogastropoda
- Order: Neogastropoda
- Family: Terebridae
- Genus: Terebra
- Species: T. albocancellata

Binomial name
- Terebra albocancellata Bratcher, 1988

= Terebra albocancellata =

Species of gastropod

Terebra albocancellata is a species of sea snail, a marine gastropod mollusc in the family Terebridae, the auger snails.

== Distribution ==
This species occurs in the Coral Sea
