= Terebra succinea =

Scientific classification
- Kingdom: Animalia
- Phylum: Mollusca
- Class: Gastropoda
- Subclass: Caenogastropoda
- Order: Neogastropoda
- Family: Terebridae
- Genus: Terebra
- Species: T. succinea

Binomial name
- Terebra succinea Hinds, 1844

Species of gastropod

Terebra succinea is a species of sea snail, a marine gastropod mollusc in the family Terebridae, the auger snails.
