= Terebra boucheti =

Scientific classification
- Kingdom: Animalia
- Phylum: Mollusca
- Class: Gastropoda
- Subclass: Caenogastropoda
- Order: Neogastropoda
- Family: Terebridae
- Genus: Terebra
- Species: T. boucheti

Binomial name
- Terebra boucheti Bratcher, 1981

Synonyms
- Cinguloterebra boucheti (Bratcher, 1981)

Species of sea snail

Terebra boucheti is a species of sea snail, a marine gastropod mollusc in the family Terebridae, the auger snails.

== Distribution ==
This marine species occurs off the Philippines.
