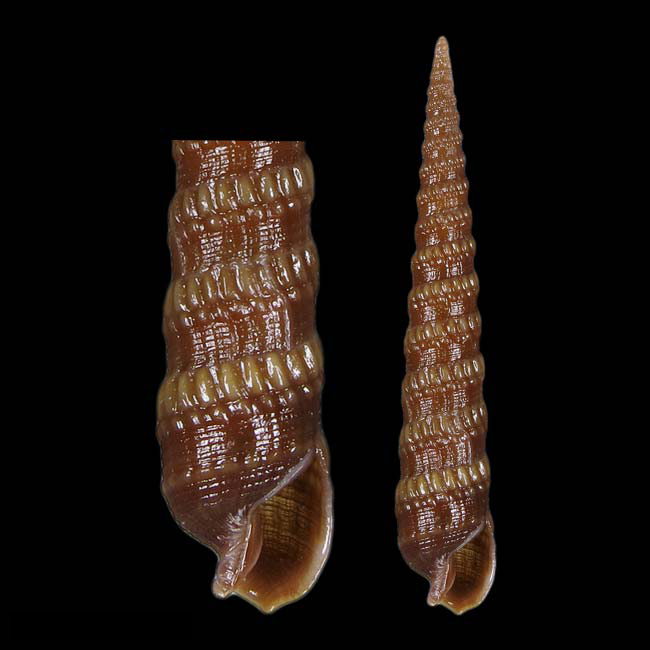
- Shell of Terebra punctum

Scientific classification
- Kingdom: Animalia
- Phylum: Mollusca
- Class: Gastropoda
- Subclass: Caenogastropoda
- Order: Neogastropoda
- Family: Terebridae
- Genus: Terebra
- Species: T. punctum

Binomial name
- Terebra punctum (Poppe, Tagaro & Terryn, 2009)

Synonyms
- Cinguloterebra punctum Poppe, Tagaro & Terryn, 2009 (original combination)

= Terebra punctum =

Species of gastropod

Terebra punctum is a species of sea snail, a marine gastropod mollusc in the family Terebridae, the auger snails.
