= Terebra jacksoniana =

Scientific classification
- Kingdom: Animalia
- Phylum: Mollusca
- Class: Gastropoda
- Subclass: Caenogastropoda
- Order: Neogastropoda
- Family: Terebridae
- Genus: Terebra
- Species: T. jacksoniana

Binomial name
- Terebra jacksoniana Garrard, 1976

Synonyms
- Pervicacia jacksoniana Garrard, 1976; Terebra fictilis Hedley, 1900

Species of gastropod

Terebra jacksoniana is a species of sea snail, a marine gastropod mollusc in the family Terebridae, the auger snails.

== Distribution ==
This species is native to regions of Australia including Ballina, New South Wales and south-eastern South Australia.
