= Terebra castaneostriata =

Scientific classification
- Kingdom: Animalia
- Phylum: Mollusca
- Class: Gastropoda
- Subclass: Caenogastropoda
- Order: Neogastropoda
- Family: Terebridae
- Genus: Terebra
- Species: T. castaneostriata

Binomial name
- Terebra castaneostriata Kosuge, 1979

Species of gastropod

Terebra castaneostriata is a species of sea snail, a marine gastropod mollusc in the family Terebridae, the auger snails.
