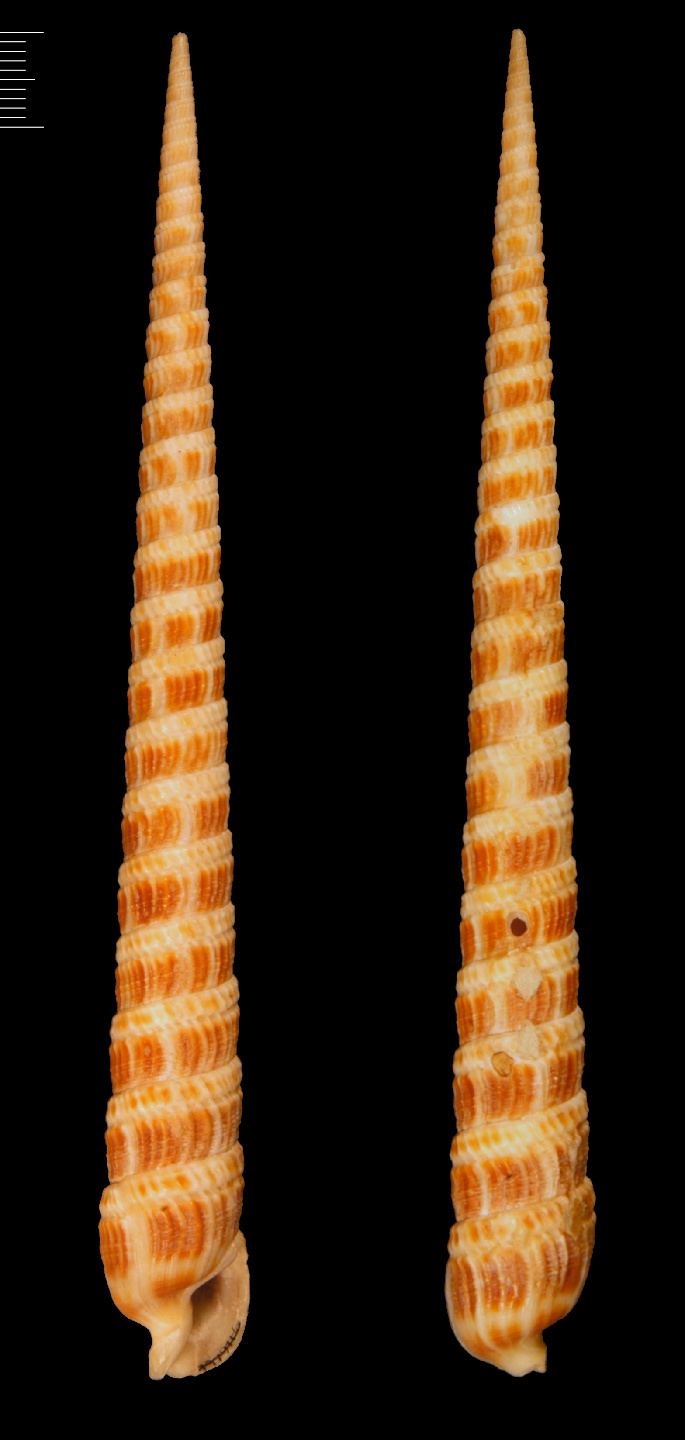
- Holotype

Scientific classification
- Kingdom: Animalia
- Phylum: Mollusca
- Class: Gastropoda
- Subclass: Caenogastropoda
- Order: Neogastropoda
- Family: Terebridae
- Genus: Terebra
- Species: T. pretiosa

Binomial name
- Terebra pretiosa Reeve, 1842

Synonyms
- Cinguloterebra pretiosa (Reeve, 1842)

= Terebra pretiosa =

Species of gastropod

Terebra pretiosa is a species of sea snail, a marine gastropod mollusc in the family Terebridae, the auger snails.
