= Terebra adamsii =

Scientific classification
- Kingdom: Animalia
- Phylum: Mollusca
- Class: Gastropoda
- Subclass: Caenogastropoda
- Order: Neogastropoda
- Family: Terebridae
- Genus: Terebra
- Species: T. adamsii

Binomial name
- Terebra adamsii E.A. Smith, 1873

Synonyms
- Cinguloterebra adamsii (E. A. Smith, 1873); Terebra hedlayana Pilsbry, 1905; Terebra hedleyi Pilsbry, 1904; Terebra jeffreysi E.A. Smith, 1879

Species of sea snail

Terebra adamsii is a species of sea snail, a marine gastropod mollusc in the family Terebridae, the auger snails.
