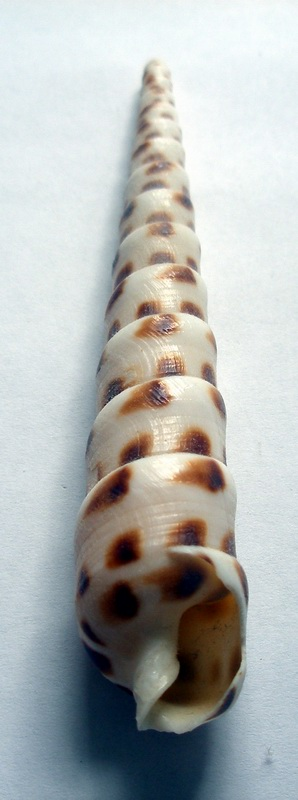

Scientific classification
- Kingdom: Animalia
- Phylum: Mollusca
- Class: Gastropoda
- Subclass: Caenogastropoda
- Order: Neogastropoda
- Family: Terebridae
- Genus: Terebra
- Species: T. consobrina

Binomial name
- Terebra consobrina Deshayes, 1857

= Terebra consobrina =

Species of gastropod

Terebra consobrina is a species of sea snail, a marine gastropod mollusc in the family Terebridae, the auger snails.

== Description ==
The size of an adult shell varies between 70 mm and 135 mm.

== Distribution ==
This species occurs in the Red Sea and in the Indian Ocean off Madagascar and Mauritius.
