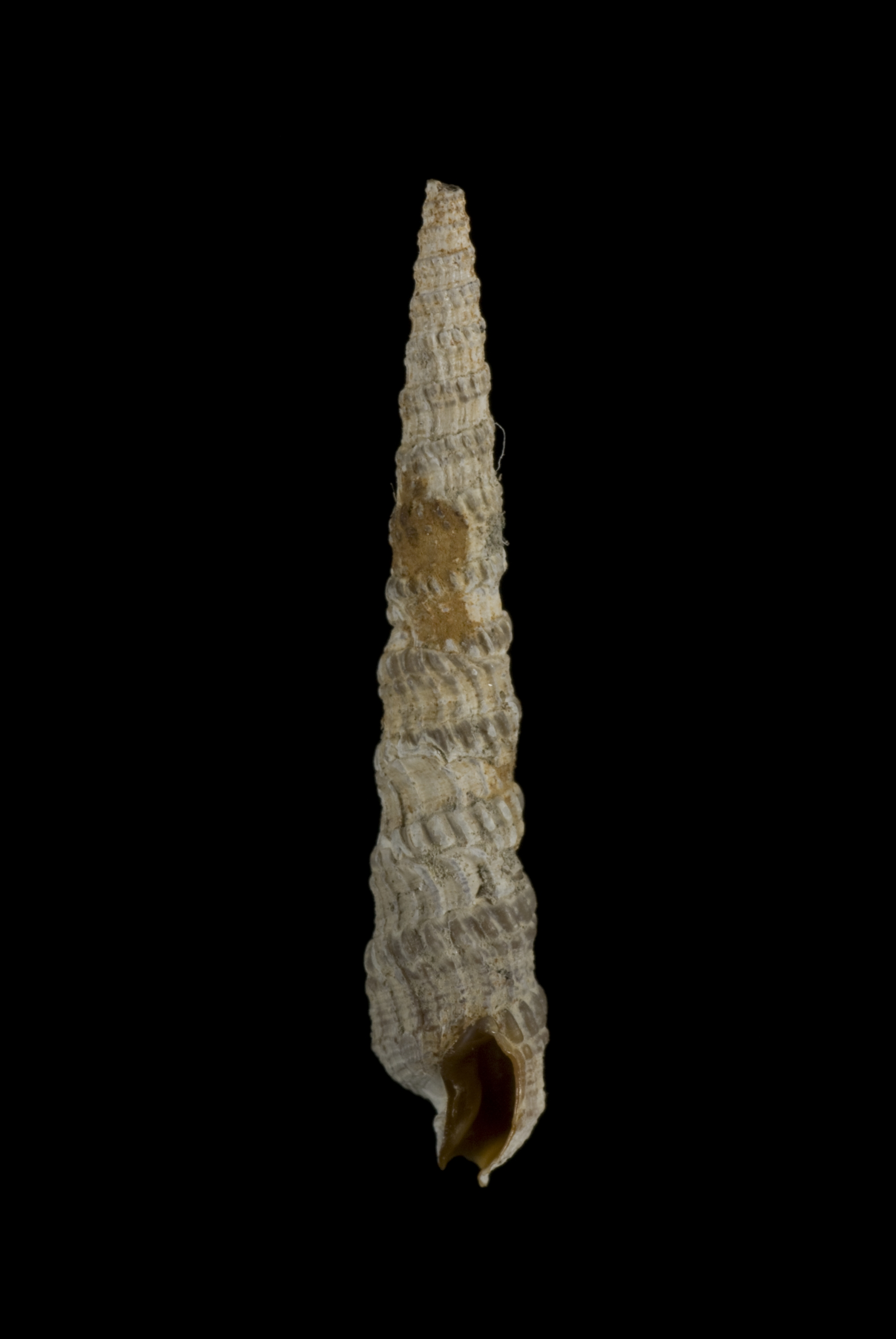
- Shell of Terebra anilis (specimen at MNHN, Paris)

Scientific classification
- Kingdom: Animalia
- Phylum: Mollusca
- Class: Gastropoda
- Subclass: Caenogastropoda
- Order: Neogastropoda
- Family: Terebridae
- Genus: Terebra
- Species: T. anilis

Binomial name
- Terebra anilis (Röding, 1798)

Synonyms
- Cinguloterebra anilis (Röding, 1798); Cinguloterebra serotina (A. Adams & Reeve, 1850); Dimidacus stramineus (Gray, 1834); Epitonium anile Röding, 1798 (original combination); Epitonium cancellatum Röding, 1798; Terebra rubrobrunnea Preston, 1908; Terebra anilis (Röding, 1798); Terebra serotina A. Adams & Reeve, 1850

= Terebra anilis =

Species of sea snail

Terebra anilis is a species of sea snail, a marine gastropod mollusc in the family Terebridae, the auger snails.

== Description ==
The length of the shell varies between 15 mm and 111 mm.

(Original description) The narrowly subulate shell is reddish brown. It contains 21 very flat whorls. These are sculptured with oblique, rather closely set transverse costae interrupted by spiral striae and two crenate sutural bands, the upper of which is much the broader. The sutures are scarcely impressed. The columella descendis in a curve, extending into a thick, projecting callus which joins the lip above. The peristome is sinuous and slightly reflexed. The aperture is narrowly ovate. The siphonal canal is short and recurved

== Distribution ==
This marine species occurs in the Central Indo-West Pacific.
