= Terebra eximia =

Scientific classification
- Kingdom: Animalia
- Phylum: Mollusca
- Class: Gastropoda
- Subclass: Caenogastropoda
- Order: Neogastropoda
- Superfamily: Conoidea
- Family: Terebridae
- Genus: Terebra
- Species: T. eximia

Binomial name
- Terebra eximia Deshayes, 1859

Synonyms
- Cinguloterebra eximia (Deshayes, 1859)

Species of gastropod

Terebra eximia is a species of sea snail, a marine gastropod mollusk in the family Terebridae, the auger snails.
