= Terebra lauretanae =

Scientific classification
- Kingdom: Animalia
- Phylum: Mollusca
- Class: Gastropoda
- Subclass: Caenogastropoda
- Order: Neogastropoda
- Family: Terebridae
- Genus: Terebra
- Species: T. lauretanae

Binomial name
- Terebra lauretanae Tenison-Woods, 1878

Synonyms
- Nototerebra lauretanae (Tennison-Woods, 1878); Terebra lauretanae tabifica Iredale, 1925

Species of gastropod

Terebra lauretanae is a species of sea snail, a marine gastropod mollusc in the family Terebridae, the auger snails.
