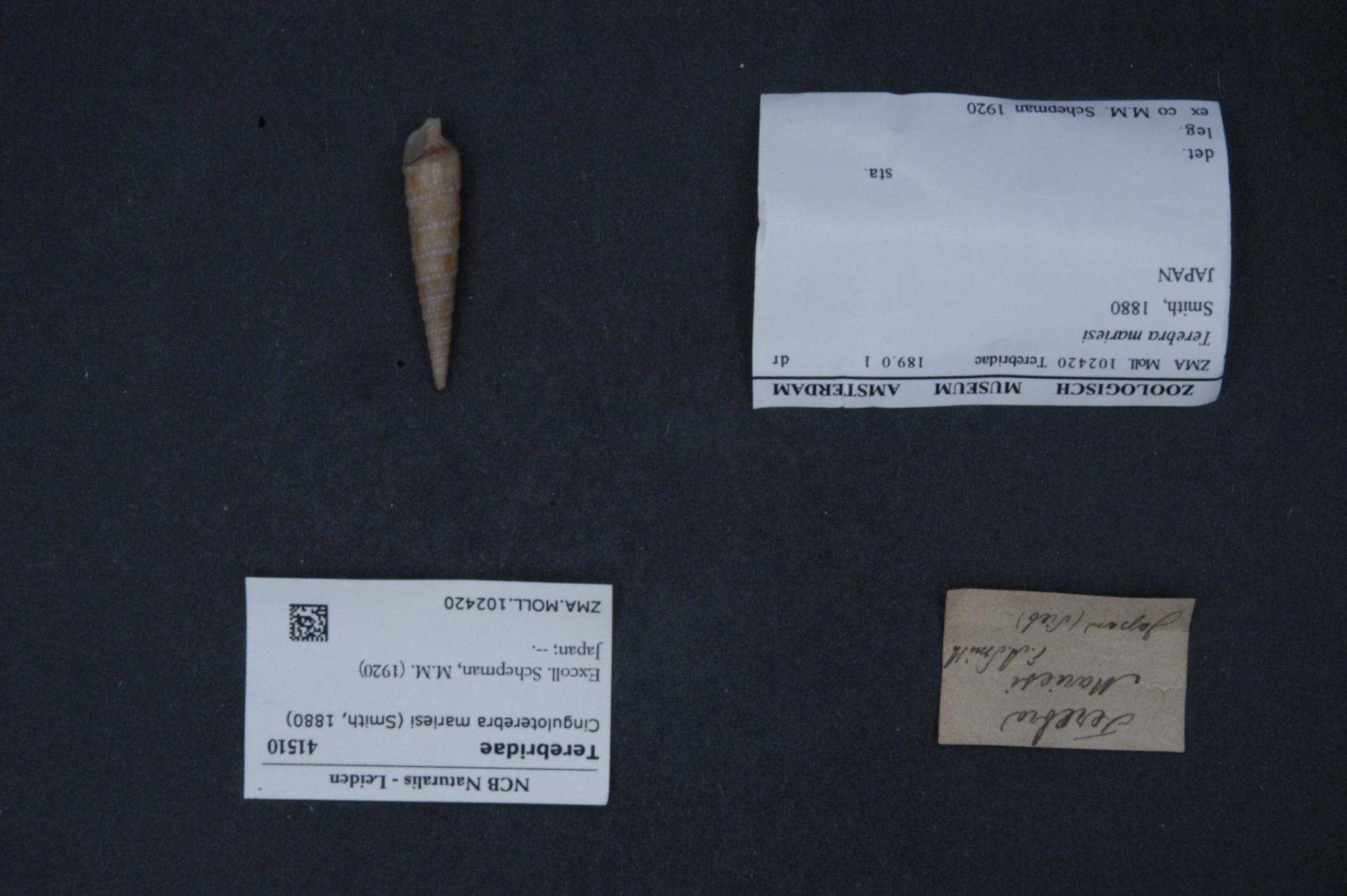

Scientific classification
- Kingdom: Animalia
- Phylum: Mollusca
- Class: Gastropoda
- Subclass: Caenogastropoda
- Order: Neogastropoda
- Family: Terebridae
- Genus: Terebra
- Species: T. mariesi

Binomial name
- Terebra mariesi E.A. Smith, 1880

Synonyms
- Cinguloterebra jefreysii (E.A. Smith, 1880); Cinguloterebra mariesi (E.A. Smith, 1880)

= Terebra mariesi =

Species of gastropod

Terebra mariesi is a species of sea snail, a marine gastropod mollusc in the family Terebridae, the auger snails.
