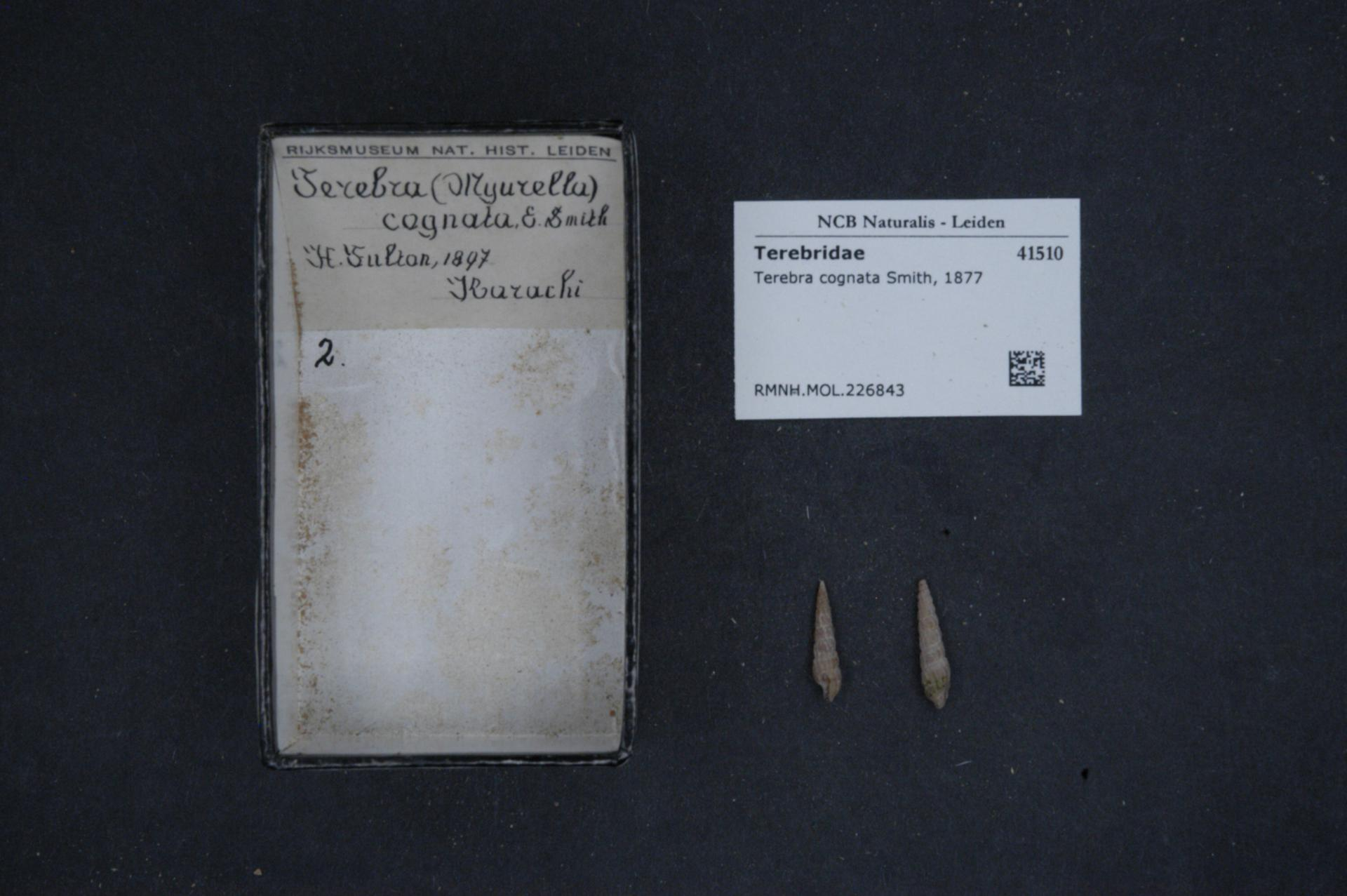

Scientific classification
- Kingdom: Animalia
- Phylum: Mollusca
- Class: Gastropoda
- Subclass: Caenogastropoda
- Order: Neogastropoda
- Family: Terebridae
- Genus: Terebra
- Species: T. cognata

Binomial name
- Terebra cognata Smith, 1877

= Terebra cognata =

Species of gastropod

Terebra cognata is a species of sea snail, a marine gastropod mollusc in the family Terebridae, the auger snails.
