= Terebra pellyi =

Scientific classification
- Kingdom: Animalia
- Phylum: Mollusca
- Class: Gastropoda
- Subclass: Caenogastropoda
- Order: Neogastropoda
- Family: Terebridae
- Genus: Terebra
- Species: T. pellyi

Binomial name
- Terebra pellyi Smith, 1877

Species of gastropod

Terebra pellyi is a species of sea snail, a marine gastropod mollusc in the family Terebridae, the auger snails. It is found in the Persian Gulf.

== Taxonomy and systematics ==
The species was described by Edgar Smith in 1877, on the basis of specimens collected in the Persian Gulf by Colonel Lewis Pelly. The specific epithet is in honor of Colonel Pelly.

== Description ==
The species is 13 mm (0.51 in) long and 3 mm (0.12 in) in diameter. It is distinguished by two to three spiral furrows around its periphery, out of which the uppermost one is most distinct.
