= Terebra floridana =

Scientific classification
- Kingdom: Animalia
- Phylum: Mollusca
- Class: Gastropoda
- Subclass: Caenogastropoda
- Order: Neogastropoda
- Family: Terebridae
- Genus: Terebra
- Species: T. floridana

Binomial name
- Terebra floridana (Dall, 1889)

Synonyms
- Cinguloterebra floridana (Dall, 1889); Subula floridana Dall, 1889; Terebra floridana stegeri Abbott, 1954

Species of gastropod

Terebra floridana is a species of sea snail in the family Terebridae, the auger snails.
