= Terebra insalli =

Scientific classification
- Kingdom: Animalia
- Phylum: Mollusca
- Class: Gastropoda
- Subclass: Caenogastropoda
- Order: Neogastropoda
- Family: Terebridae
- Genus: Terebra
- Species: T. insalli

Binomial name
- Terebra insalli Bratcher & Burch, 1976

Synonyms
- Cinguloterebra insalli (Bratcher & R. D. Burch, 1976)

Species of gastropod

Terebra insalli is a species of sea snail, a marine gastropod mollusc in the family Terebridae, the auger snails.
