= Terebra cossignanii =

Scientific classification
- Kingdom: Animalia
- Phylum: Mollusca
- Class: Gastropoda
- Subclass: Caenogastropoda
- Order: Neogastropoda
- Family: Terebridae
- Genus: Terebra
- Species: T. cossignanii

Binomial name
- Terebra cossignanii Aubry, 2008

Species of sea snail

Terebra cossignanii is a species of sea snail, a marine gastropod mollusc in the family Terebridae, the auger snails.
