= Terebra ligata =

Scientific classification
- Kingdom: Animalia
- Phylum: Mollusca
- Class: Gastropoda
- Subclass: Caenogastropoda
- Order: Neogastropoda
- Family: Terebridae
- Genus: Terebra
- Species: T. ligata

Binomial name
- Terebra ligata Hinds, 1844

Species of gastropod

Terebra ligata is a species of sea snail, a marine gastropod mollusc in the family Terebridae, the auger snails.

== Description ==
Shell size 40 mm.

== Distribution ==
Marquesas Islands.
