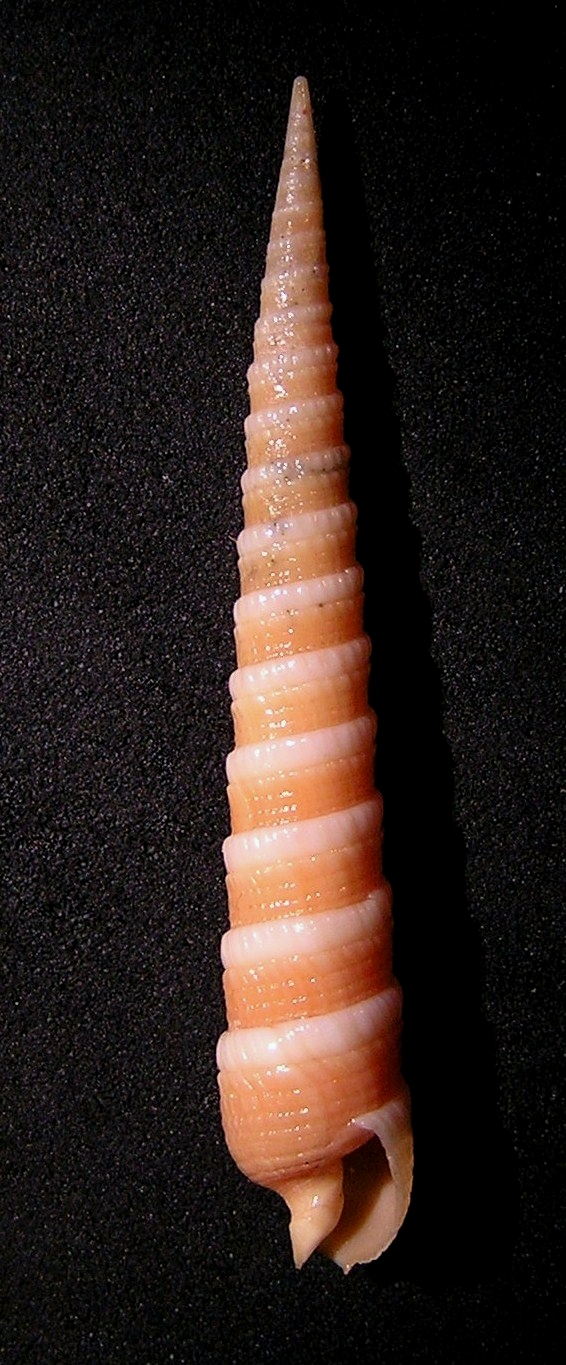
- Apertural view of a shell of Terebra amanda

Scientific classification
- Kingdom: Animalia
- Phylum: Mollusca
- Class: Gastropoda
- Subclass: Caenogastropoda
- Order: Neogastropoda
- Family: Terebridae
- Genus: Terebra
- Species: T. amanda

Binomial name
- Terebra amanda Hinds, 1844

Synonyms
- Dimidacus stramineus (Gray, 1967); Perirhoe melamans Iredale, T., 1929; Terebra albomarginata Deshayes, 1859; Terebra (Amanda-group) albomarginata Deshayes, G.P., 1859; Terebra straminea Gray, 1960; Terebra unicolor Preston, 1908

= Terebra amanda =

Species of gastropod

Terebra amanda, common name Amanda's auger, is a species of sea snail, a marine gastropod mollusc in the family Terebridae, the auger snails.

== Description ==
The length of the shell varies between 25 mm and 95 mm.

(Original description) The shell is rather bluntly, elongately subulate. It is pale brownish orange throughout. It contains 17 whorls, sculptured with a coarse infrasutural spiral crenate rib and five smaller spiral crenate ribs The interstices are finely punctate. The aperture is small. The columella recurved and twisted. The siphonal canal is short.

== Distribution ==
This marine species occurs in the Red Sea, in the Indo-Pacific and off New Guinea, the Philippines and the Solomons.
