= Terebra lindae =

Scientific classification
- Kingdom: Animalia
- Phylum: Mollusca
- Class: Gastropoda
- Subclass: Caenogastropoda
- Order: Neogastropoda
- Family: Terebridae
- Genus: Terebra
- Species: T. lindae

Binomial name
- Terebra lindae Petuch, 1987

Species of gastropod

Terebra lindae is a species of sea snail, a marine gastropod mollusc in the family Terebridae, the auger snails.

== Description ==
Original description: "Shell very elongated, slender: suture bordered by row of very large, rounded beads; row of smaller beads below (anterior to) row of large beads; rest of whorl smooth, shiny; color orange-tan with two rows of larger, reddish-brown spots on each whorl, one row along suture, often between subsutural beads; columella and siphonal canal bright yellow; interior of aperture orange-tan."

== Distribution ==
Locus typicus: "(Dredged from) 150 metres depth
50 kilometres South of Apalachicola, Florida, USA."
