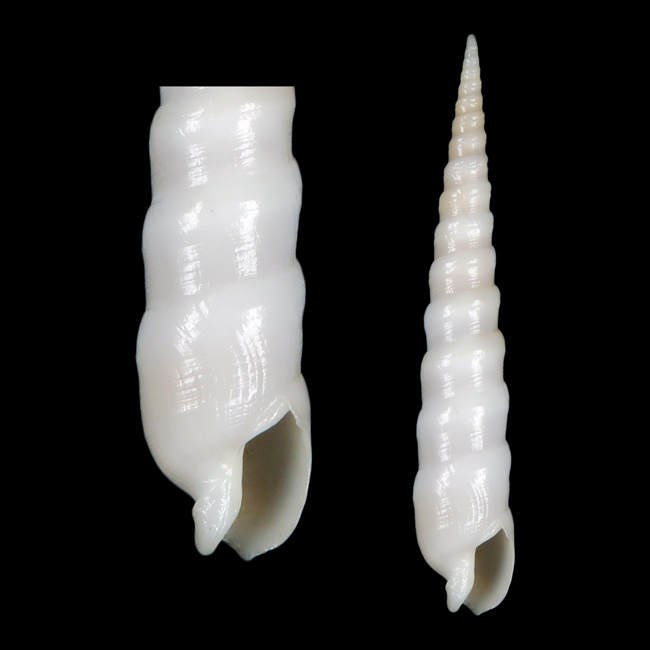

Scientific classification
- Kingdom: Animalia
- Phylum: Mollusca
- Class: Gastropoda
- Subclass: Caenogastropoda
- Order: Neogastropoda
- Family: Terebridae
- Genus: Terebra
- Species: T. terryni

Binomial name
- Terebra terryni Poppe, Tagaro & Goto, 2018

= Terebra terryni =

Species of sea snail

Terebra terryni is a species of sea snail, a marine gastropod mollusc in the family Terebridae.

== Distribution ==
This marine species occurs off the Philippines.

== Original description ==
- Poppe G.T., Tagaro S.P. & Goto Y. (2018). New marine species from the Central Philippines. Visaya. 5(1): 91–135. page(s): 111, pl. 12 figs 4–5.
