= Terebra walkeri =

Scientific classification
- Kingdom: Animalia
- Phylum: Mollusca
- Class: Gastropoda
- Subclass: Caenogastropoda
- Order: Neogastropoda
- Family: Terebridae
- Genus: Terebra
- Species: T. walkeri

Binomial name
- Terebra walkeri Smith, 1899

Species of sea snail

Terebra walkeri is a species of sea snail in the family Terebridae.
