= Terebra caddeyi =

Scientific classification
- Kingdom: Animalia
- Phylum: Mollusca
- Class: Gastropoda
- Subclass: Caenogastropoda
- Order: Neogastropoda
- Family: Terebridae
- Genus: Terebra
- Species: T. caddeyi

Binomial name
- Terebra caddeyi Bratcher & Cernohorsky, 1982

Synonyms
- Cinguloterebra caddeyi (Bratcher & Cernohorsky, 1982)

Species of sea snail

Terebra caddeyi is a species of sea snail, a marine gastropod mollusc in the family Terebridae, the auger snails.
