= Terebra virgo =

Scientific classification
- Kingdom: Animalia
- Phylum: Mollusca
- Class: Gastropoda
- Subclass: Caenogastropoda
- Order: Neogastropoda
- Family: Terebridae
- Genus: Terebra
- Species: T. virgo

Binomial name
- Terebra virgo Schepman, 1913

Species of gastropod

Terebra virgo is a species of sea snail, a marine gastropod mollusc in the family Terebridae, the auger snails.
