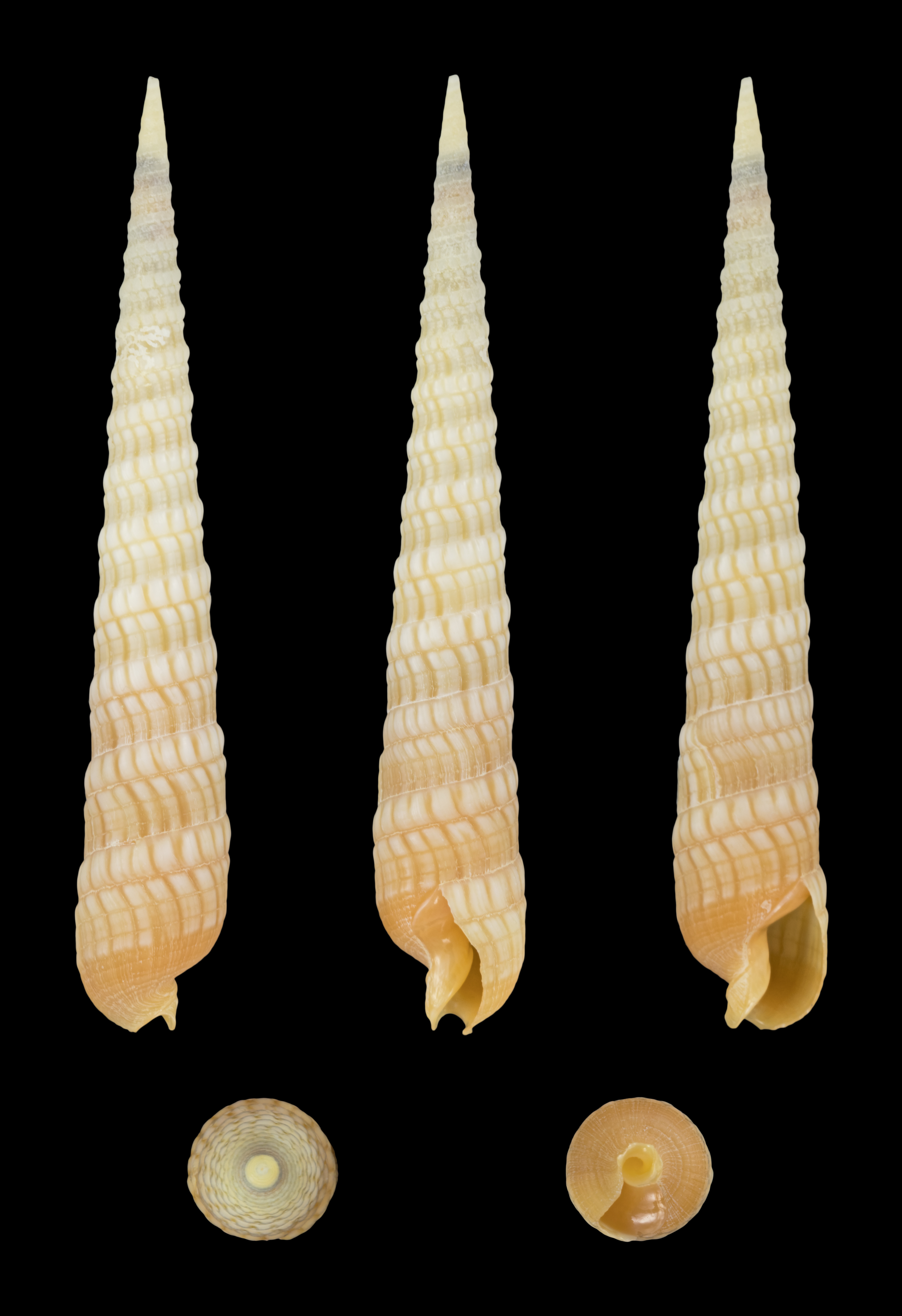

Scientific classification
- Kingdom: Animalia
- Phylum: Mollusca
- Class: Gastropoda
- Subclass: Caenogastropoda
- Order: Neogastropoda
- Family: Terebridae
- Genus: Terebra
- Species: T. babylonia

Binomial name
- Terebra babylonia Lamarck, 1822

Synonyms
- Dimidacus babylonia (Lamarck, 1822); Terebra striata Gray, 1834

= Terebra babylonia =

Species of gastropod

Terebra babylonia is a species of sea snail, a marine gastropod mollusc in the family Terebridae, the auger snails.

== Distribution ==
This marine species occurs in the East Pacific and off Papua New Guinea
