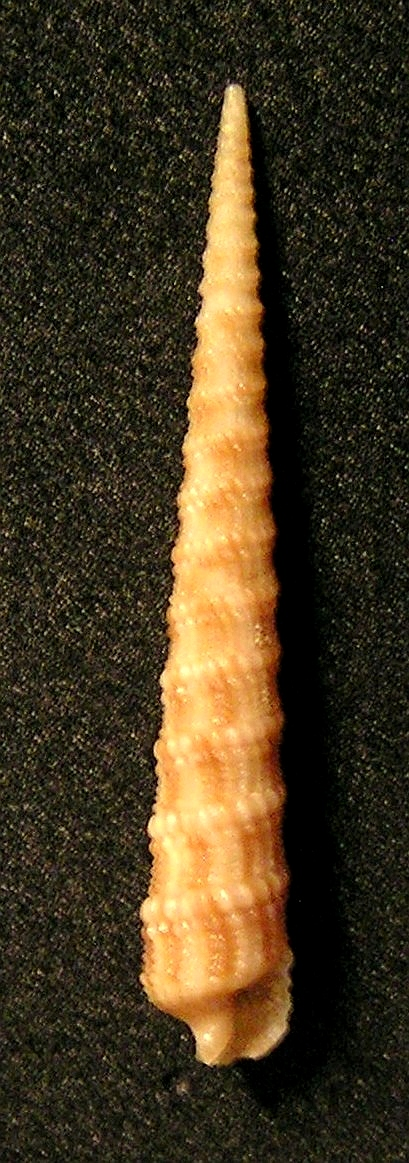
- Apertural view of a shell of Terebra salisburyi

Scientific classification
- Kingdom: Animalia
- Phylum: Mollusca
- Class: Gastropoda
- Subclass: Caenogastropoda
- Order: Neogastropoda
- Family: Terebridae
- Genus: Terebra
- Species: T. salisburyi

Binomial name
- Terebra salisburyi Drivas & Jay, 1998

Synonyms
- Cinguloterebra salisburyi (Drivas & Jay, 1998)

= Terebra salisburyi =

Species of gastropod

Terebra salisburyi is a species of sea snail, a marine gastropod mollusc in the family Terebridae, the auger snails.

== Description ==
The length of the shell varies between 30 mm and 77 mm.

== Distribution ==
This marine species occurs off Mauritius and the Philippines.
