= Terebra russetae =

Scientific classification
- Kingdom: Animalia
- Phylum: Mollusca
- Class: Gastropoda
- Subclass: Caenogastropoda
- Order: Neogastropoda
- Family: Terebridae
- Genus: Terebra
- Species: T. russetae

Binomial name
- Terebra russetae (Garrard, 1976)

Synonyms
- Cinguloterebra russetae (Garrard, 1976); Pervicacia russetae Garrard, 1976

Species of gastropod

Terebra russetae is a species of sea snail, a marine gastropod mollusc in the family Terebridae, the auger snails.
