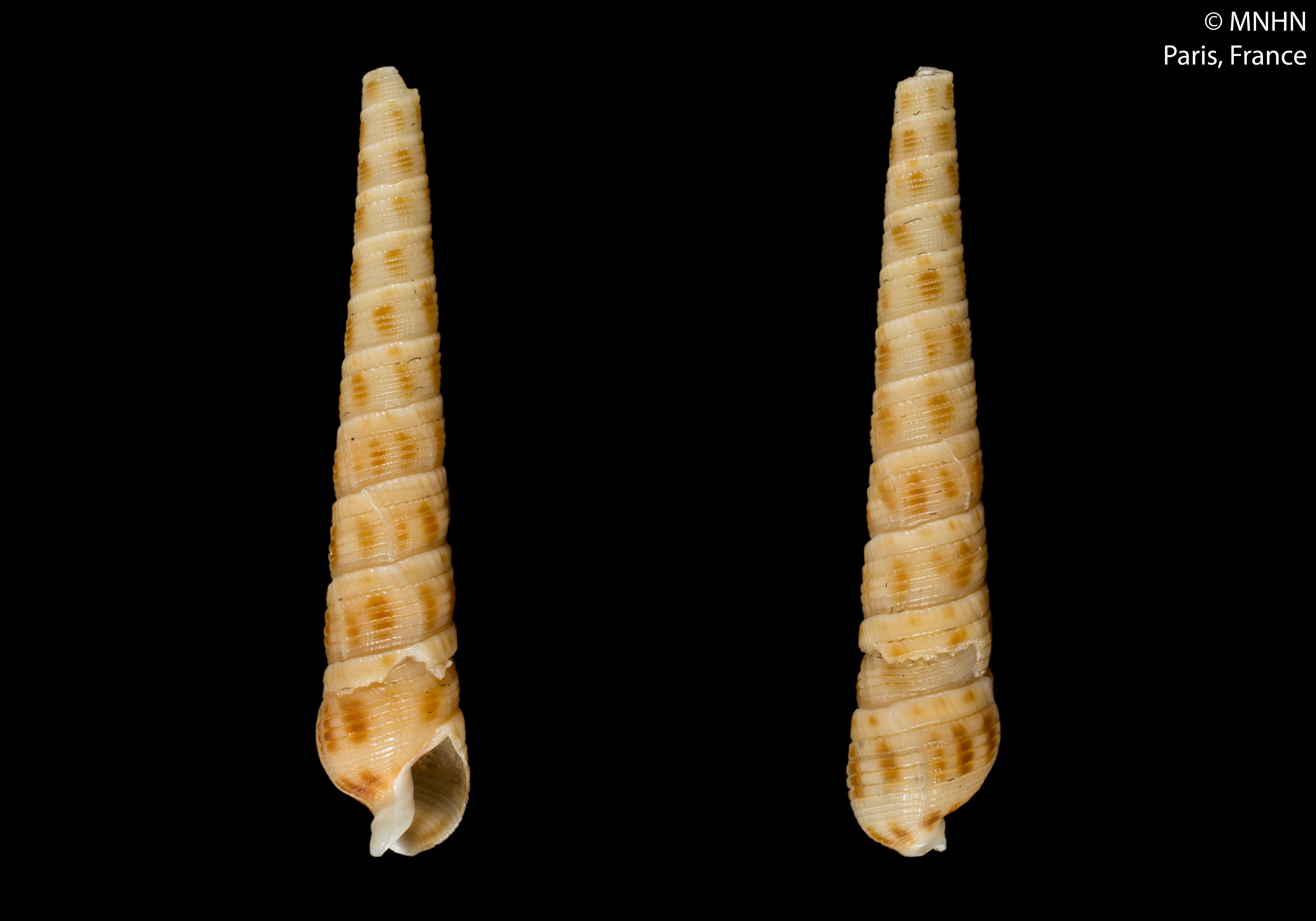
- Shell of Terebra vanuatuensis (holotype at MNHN, Paris)

Scientific classification
- Kingdom: Animalia
- Phylum: Mollusca
- Class: Gastropoda
- Subclass: Caenogastropoda
- Order: Neogastropoda
- Family: Terebridae
- Genus: Terebra
- Species: T. vanuatuensis

Binomial name
- Terebra vanuatuensis Aubry, 1999

= Terebra vanuatuensis =

Species of gastropod

Terebra vanuatuensis is a species of sea snail, a marine gastropod mollusc in the family Terebridae, the auger snails.

== Description ==
The length of the shell attains 37 mm.

== Distribution ==
This marine species occurs off Vanuatu.
