= Terebra raybaudii =

Scientific classification
- Kingdom: Animalia
- Phylum: Mollusca
- Class: Gastropoda
- Subclass: Caenogastropoda
- Order: Neogastropoda
- Family: Terebridae
- Genus: Terebra
- Species: T. raybaudii

Binomial name
- Terebra raybaudii (Aubry, 1993)

Synonyms
- Cinguloterebra raybaudi [sic] (misspelling); Cinguloterebra raybaudii (Aubry, 1993)

Species of gastropod

Terebra raybaudii is a species of sea snail, a marine gastropod mollusc in the family Terebridae, the auger snails.
