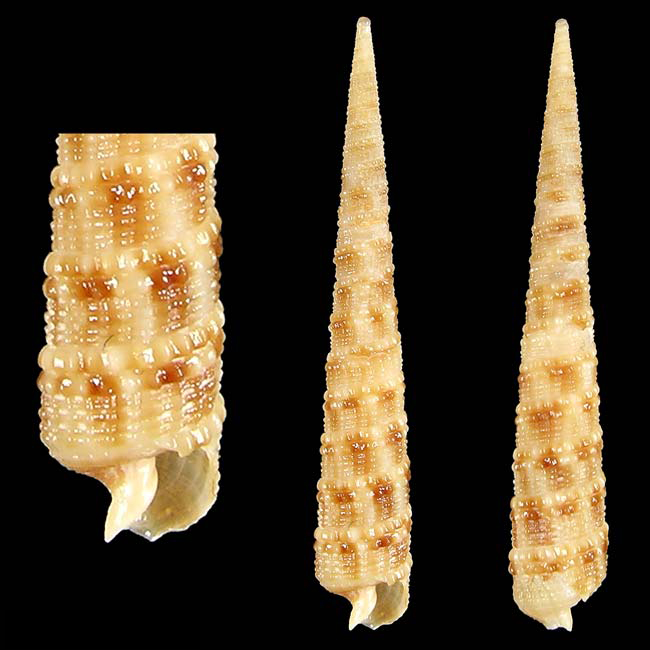
- Shell of Terebra neglecta

Scientific classification
- Kingdom: Animalia
- Phylum: Mollusca
- Class: Gastropoda
- Subclass: Caenogastropoda
- Order: Neogastropoda
- Family: Terebridae
- Genus: Terebra
- Species: T. neglecta

Binomial name
- Terebra neglecta (Poppe, Tagaro & Terryn, 2009)

Synonyms
- Cinguloterebra neglecta Poppe, Tagaro & Terryn, 2009 (original combination)

= Terebra neglecta =

Species of gastropod

Terebra neglecta is a species of sea snail, a marine gastropod mollusc in the family Terebridae, the auger snails.
