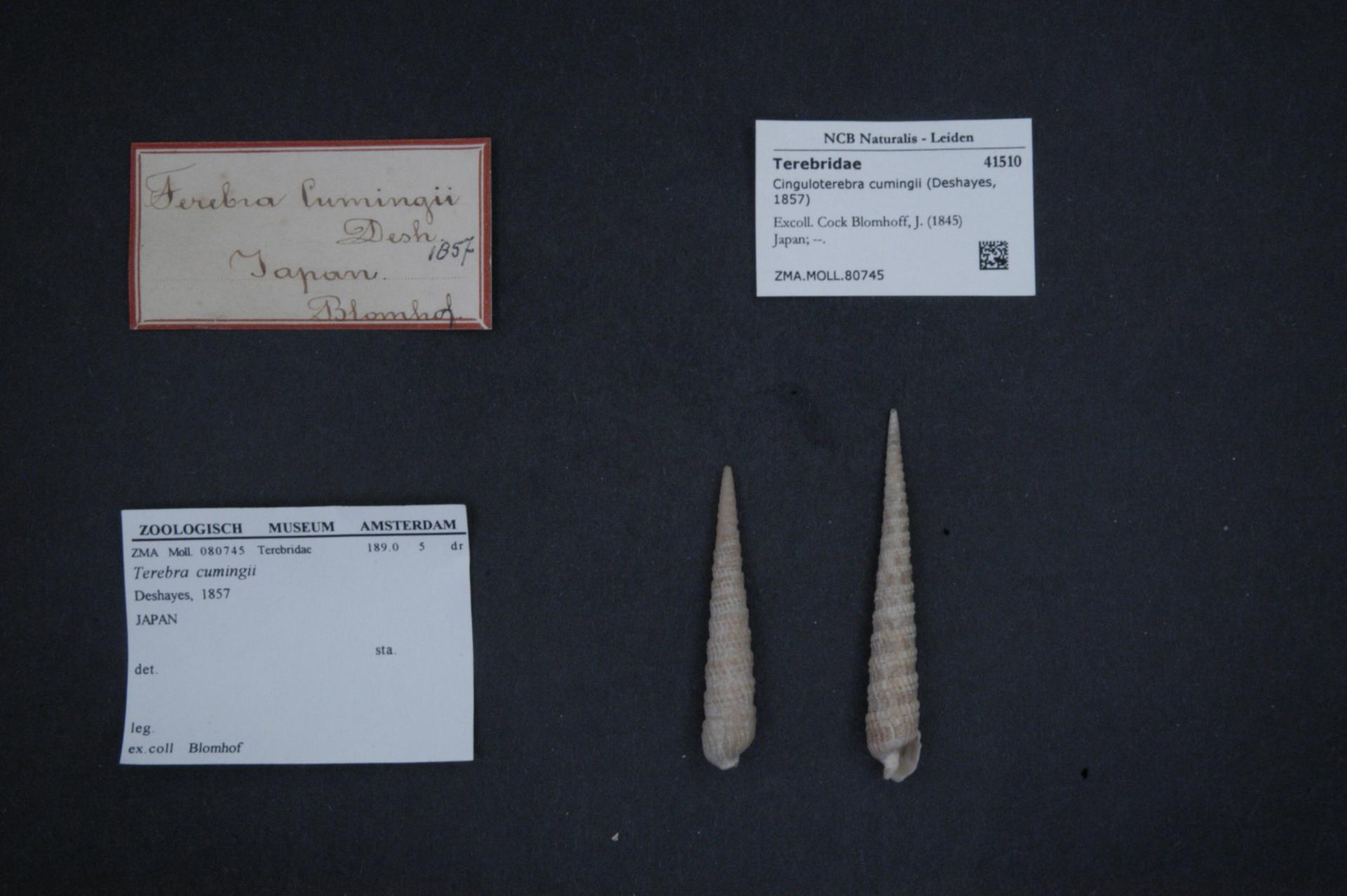

Scientific classification
- Kingdom: Animalia
- Phylum: Mollusca
- Class: Gastropoda
- Subclass: Caenogastropoda
- Order: Neogastropoda
- Family: Terebridae
- Genus: Terebra
- Species: T. cumingii

Binomial name
- Terebra cumingii Deshayes, 1857

Synonyms
- Cinguloterebra cumingii (Deshayes, 1857)

= Terebra cumingii =

Species of gastropod

Terebra cumingii is a species of sea snail, a marine gastropod mollusc in the family Terebridae, the auger snails.
