= Terebra vicdani =

Scientific classification
- Kingdom: Animalia
- Phylum: Mollusca
- Class: Gastropoda
- Subclass: Caenogastropoda
- Order: Neogastropoda
- Family: Terebridae
- Genus: Terebra
- Species: T. vicdani

Binomial name
- Terebra vicdani Kosuge, 1981

Synonyms
- Cinguloterebra vicdani (Kosuge, 1981); Terebra (Myurella) vicdani Kosuge, 1981 (basionym)

Species of gastropod

Terebra vicdani is a species of sea snail, a marine gastropod mollusc in the family Terebridae, the auger snails.
