= Terebra luandensis =

Scientific classification
- Kingdom: Animalia
- Phylum: Mollusca
- Class: Gastropoda
- Subclass: Caenogastropoda
- Order: Neogastropoda
- Family: Terebridae
- Genus: Terebra
- Species: T. luandensis

Binomial name
- Terebra luandensis Aubry, 2008

Synonyms
- Duplicaria luandensis (Aubry, 2008)

Species of gastropod

Terebra luandensis is a species of sea snail, a marine gastropod mollusk in the family Terebridae, the auger snails.

The status of this species is uncertain.
