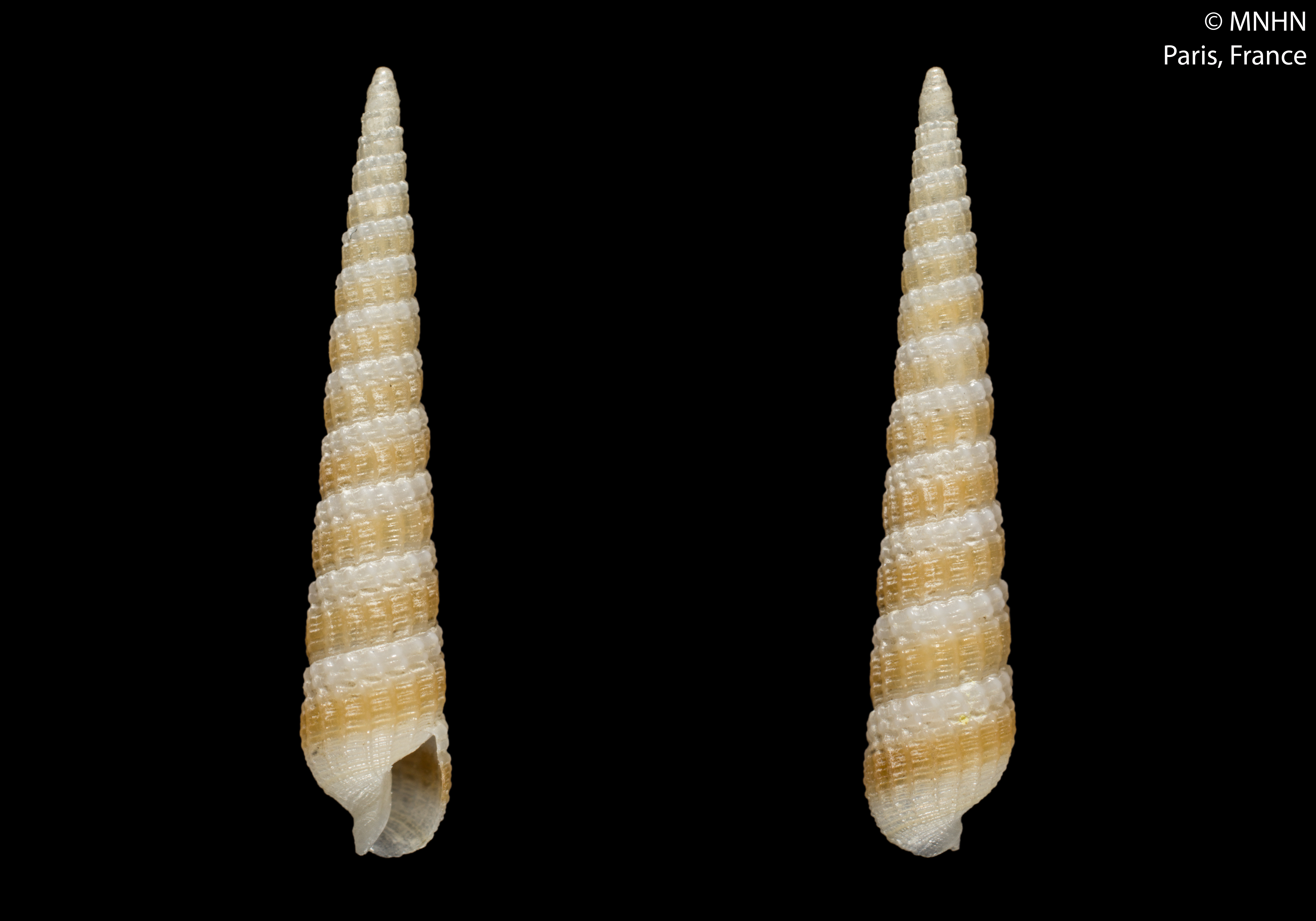
- Shell of Terebra noumeaensis (holotype at MNHN, Paris)

Scientific classification
- Kingdom: Animalia
- Phylum: Mollusca
- Class: Gastropoda
- Subclass: Caenogastropoda
- Order: Neogastropoda
- Superfamily: Conoidea
- Family: Terebridae
- Genus: Terebra
- Species: T. noumeaensis

Binomial name
- Terebra noumeaensis Aubry, 1999

= Terebra noumeaensis =

Species of gastropod

Terebra noumeaensis is a species of sea snail, a marine gastropod mollusc in the family Terebridae, the auger snails.

== Distribution ==
This marine species occurs off New Caledonia.
