= Terebra grayi =

Scientific classification
- Kingdom: Animalia
- Phylum: Mollusca
- Class: Gastropoda
- Subclass: Caenogastropoda
- Order: Neogastropoda
- Family: Terebridae
- Genus: Terebra
- Species: T. grayi

Binomial name
- Terebra grayi E.A. Smith, 1877

Synonyms
- Strioterebrum grayi (E. A. Smith, 1877); Terebra gracilis Gray,1834 (Invalid: junior homonym of Terebra gracilis Lea, 1833; Terebra grayi is a replacement name)

Species of gastropod

Terebra grayi is a species of sea snail, a marine gastropod mollusk in the family Terebridae, the auger snails.

== Taxonomy ==
The name is temporally accepted as an unreplaced junior homonym (junior homonym of Terebra grayi E.A. Smith, 1877)
