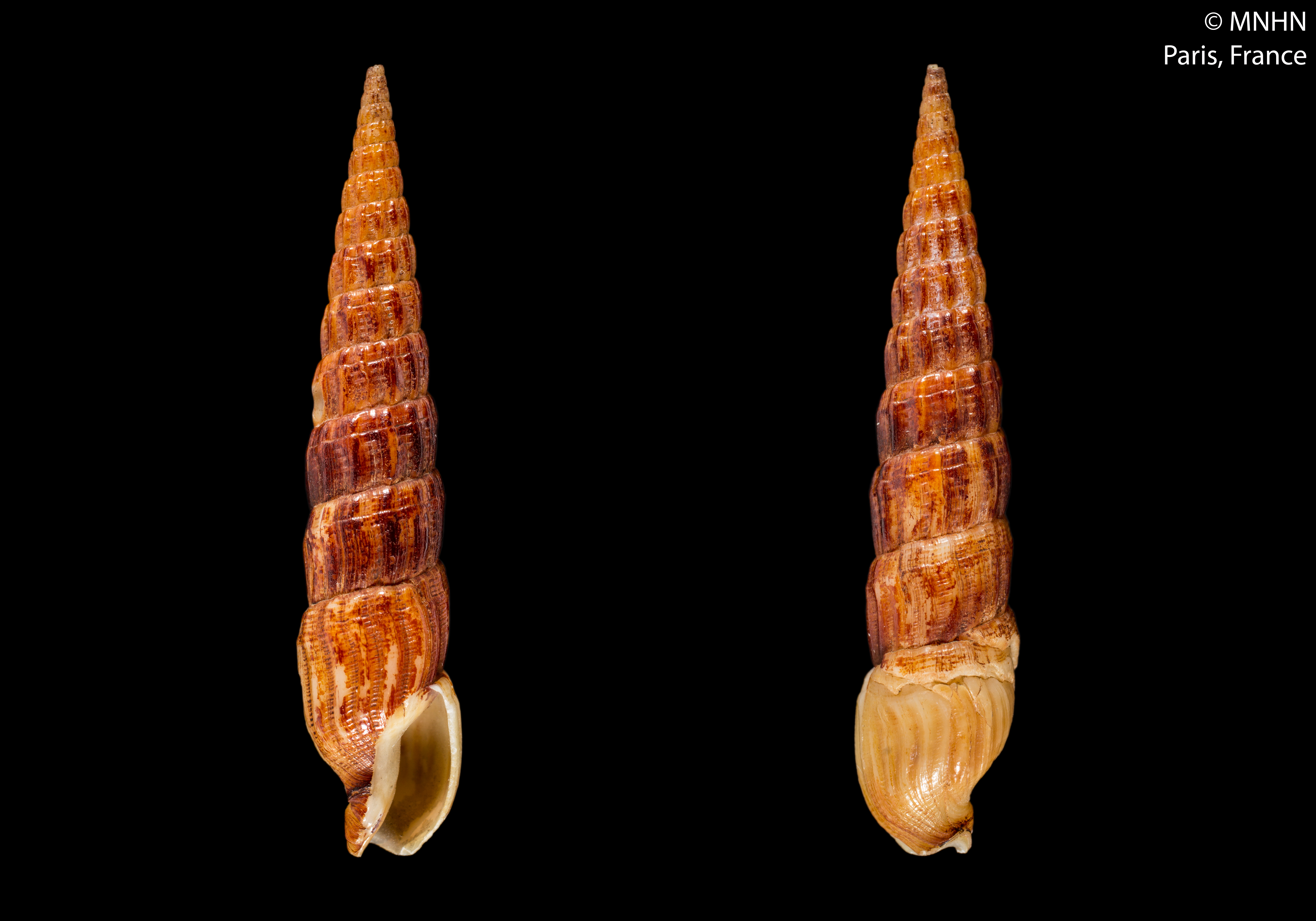
- Shell of Terebra subangulata (holotype at MNHN, Paris)

Scientific classification
- Kingdom: Animalia
- Phylum: Mollusca
- Class: Gastropoda
- Subclass: Caenogastropoda
- Order: Neogastropoda
- Family: Terebridae
- Genus: Terebra
- Species: T. subangulata

Binomial name
- Terebra subangulata Deshayes, 1859

= Terebra subangulata =

Species of gastropod

Terebra subangulata is a species of sea snail, a marine gastropod mollusc in the family Terebridae, the auger snails.

== Description ==
The Terebra subangulata is a species of sea snail, belonging to the Terebridae family (commonly known as auger snails). The length of the shell attains 35.5 mm. It is usually adorned in a subtle palette of white, or light brown, often embellished with delicate, intricate spiral lines.
