= Terebra montgomeryi =

Scientific classification
- Kingdom: Animalia
- Phylum: Mollusca
- Class: Gastropoda
- Subclass: Caenogastropoda
- Order: Neogastropoda
- Family: Terebridae
- Genus: Terebra
- Species: T. montgomeryi

Binomial name
- Terebra montgomeryi Burch, 1965

Species of gastropod

Terebra montgomeryi is a species of sea snail, a marine gastropod mollusc in the family Terebridae, the auger snails.
