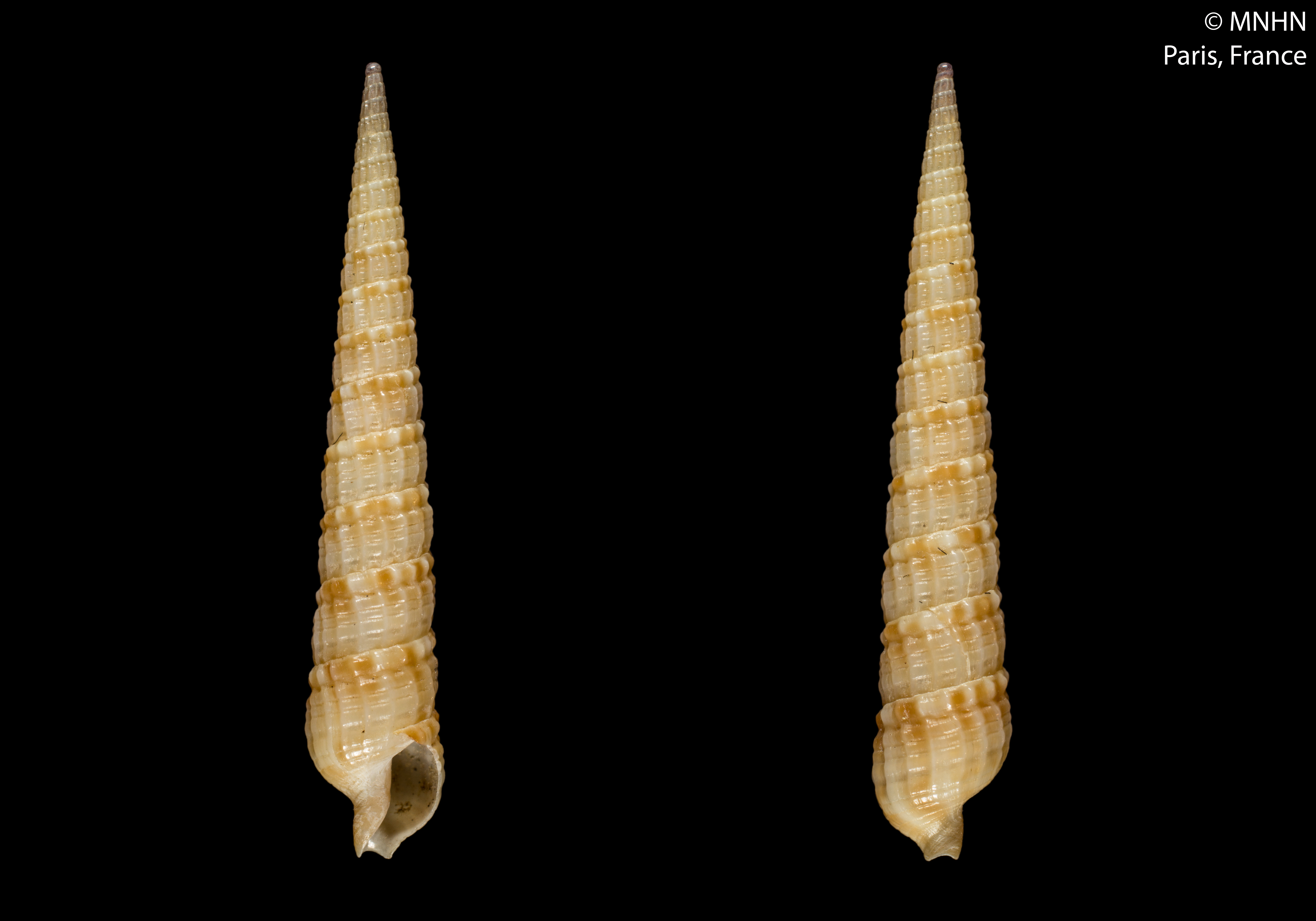
- Shell of Terebra levantina (holotype at MNHN, Paris)

Scientific classification
- Kingdom: Animalia
- Phylum: Mollusca
- Class: Gastropoda
- Subclass: Caenogastropoda
- Order: Neogastropoda
- Family: Terebridae
- Genus: Terebra
- Species: T. levantina

Binomial name
- Terebra levantina Aubry, 1999

Synonyms
- Terebra moncuri Sprague, 2004

= Terebra levantina =

Species of gastropod

Terebra levantina is a species of sea snail, a marine gastropod mollusc in the family Terebridae, the auger snails.

== Distribution ==
This marine species occurs off the Philippines.
