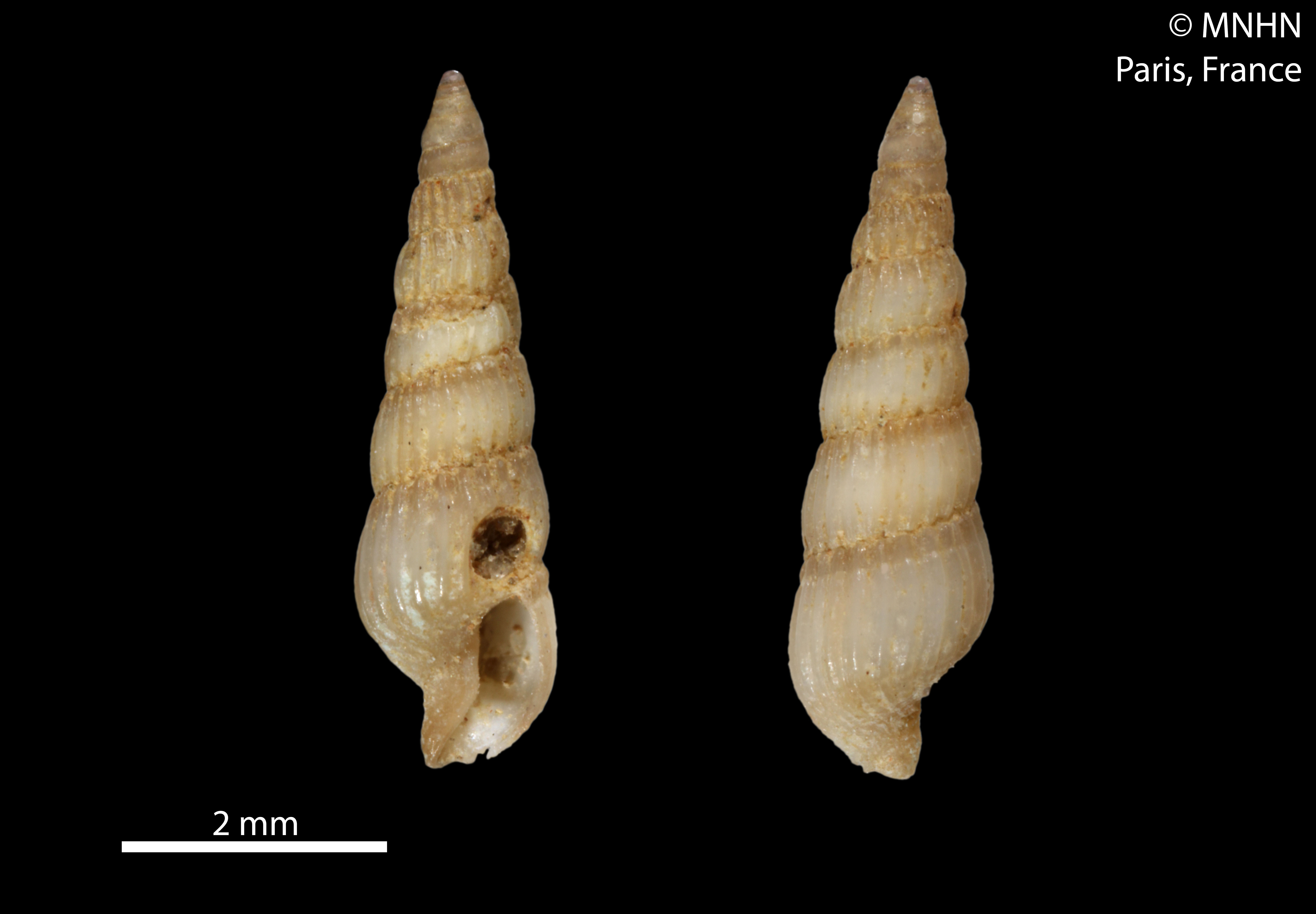
- Shell of Terebra reticularis (paratype at MNHN, Paris)

Scientific classification
- Kingdom: Animalia
- Phylum: Mollusca
- Class: Gastropoda
- Subclass: Caenogastropoda
- Order: Neogastropoda
- Family: Terebridae
- Genus: Terebra
- Species: T. reticularis

Binomial name
- Terebra reticularis (Pecchioli in Sacco, 1891)

Synonyms
- Strioterebrum reticulare Pecchiolo in Sacco, 1891 (original combination); Terebra pseudoturbinella Talavera, 1975; Terebra reticulare (Pecchioli in Sacco, 1891) (incorrect gender agreement of specific epithet)

= Terebra reticularis =

Species of gastropod

Terebra reticularis is a species of sea snail, a marine gastropod mollusc in the family Terebridae, the auger snails. It is often referred to as Terebra pseudoturbonilla as well, although it is an unaccepted name.

== Description ==
The width of the Holotype shell is ~1.5 mm with the length of 6 mm. It has been said to be similar in looks with the genus Turbonilla, distinct only due to the last spiral and is said to be the smallest of the genus Terebra. The columella is light brown, and contains 6-9 spirals.

== Distribution ==
This marine species occurs off Mauritania and the Congo, and can be found at depths ranges of 20 and 130 meters.
