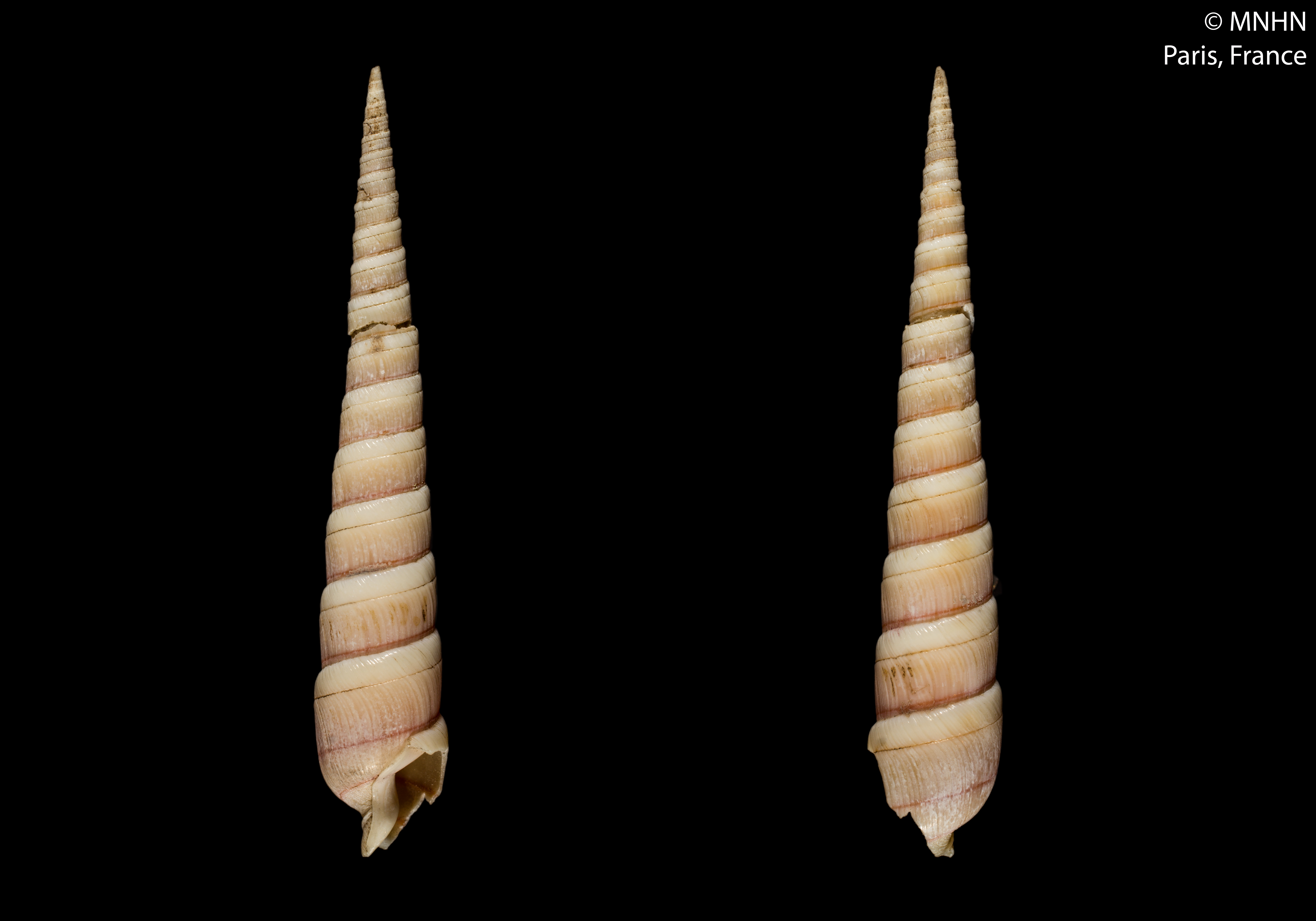
- Shell of Terebra tricolor (holotype at MNHN, Paris)

Scientific classification
- Kingdom: Animalia
- Phylum: Mollusca
- Class: Gastropoda
- Subclass: Caenogastropoda
- Order: Neogastropoda
- Family: Terebridae
- Genus: Terebra
- Species: T. tricolor

Binomial name
- Terebra tricolor Sowerby I, 1825

Synonyms
- Cinguloterebra tricolor (Sowerby I, 1825); Terebra taeniolata Quoy & Gaimard, 1833

= Terebra tricolor =

Species of gastropod

Terebra tricolor is a species of sea snail, a marine gastropod mollusk in the family Terebridae, the auger snails.

== Description ==
The length of the shell attains 54.5 mm.
