= Terebra mamillata =

Scientific classification
- Kingdom: Animalia
- Phylum: Mollusca
- Class: Gastropoda
- Subclass: Caenogastropoda
- Order: Neogastropoda
- Family: Terebridae
- Genus: Terebra
- Species: T. mamillata

Binomial name
- Terebra mamillata R.B. Watson, 1886

Synonyms
- Terebra lillianae Withney, 1976; Cinguloterebra mamillata (Watson, 1886)

Species of gastropod

Terebra mamillata is a species of sea snail, a marine gastropod mollusc in the family Terebridae, the auger snails.
