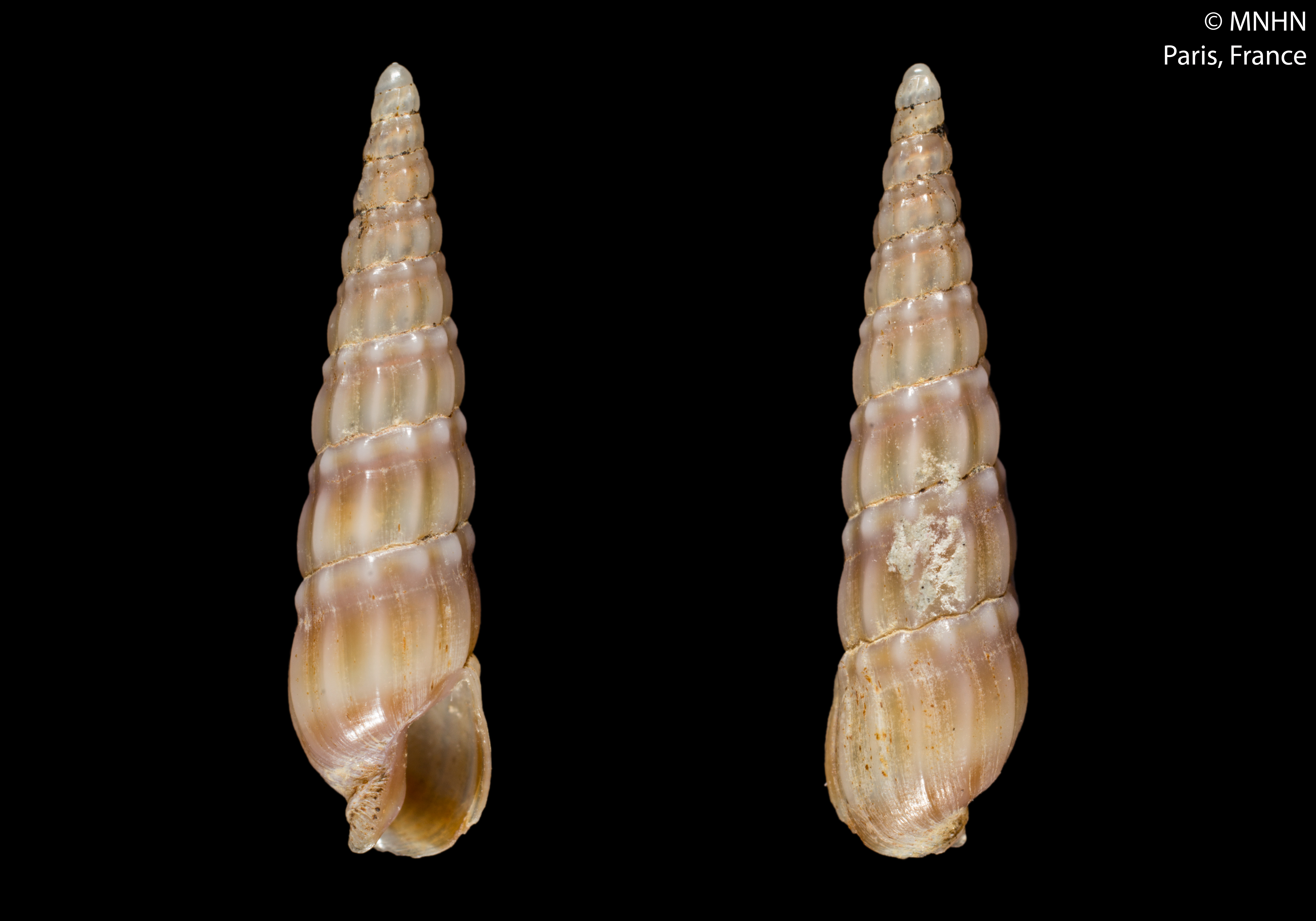
- Shell of Terebra fernandesi (holotype at MNHN, Paris)

Scientific classification
- Kingdom: Animalia
- Phylum: Mollusca
- Class: Gastropoda
- Subclass: Caenogastropoda
- Order: Neogastropoda
- Family: Terebridae
- Genus: Terebra
- Species: T. fernandesi

Binomial name
- Terebra fernandesi Bouchet, 1983

Synonyms
- Euterebra fernandesi (Bouchet, 1982)

= Terebra fernandesi =

Species of gastropod

Terebra fernandesi is a species of sea snail, a marine gastropod mollusc in the family Terebridae, the auger snails.

== Distribution ==
This marine species occurs off Angola.
