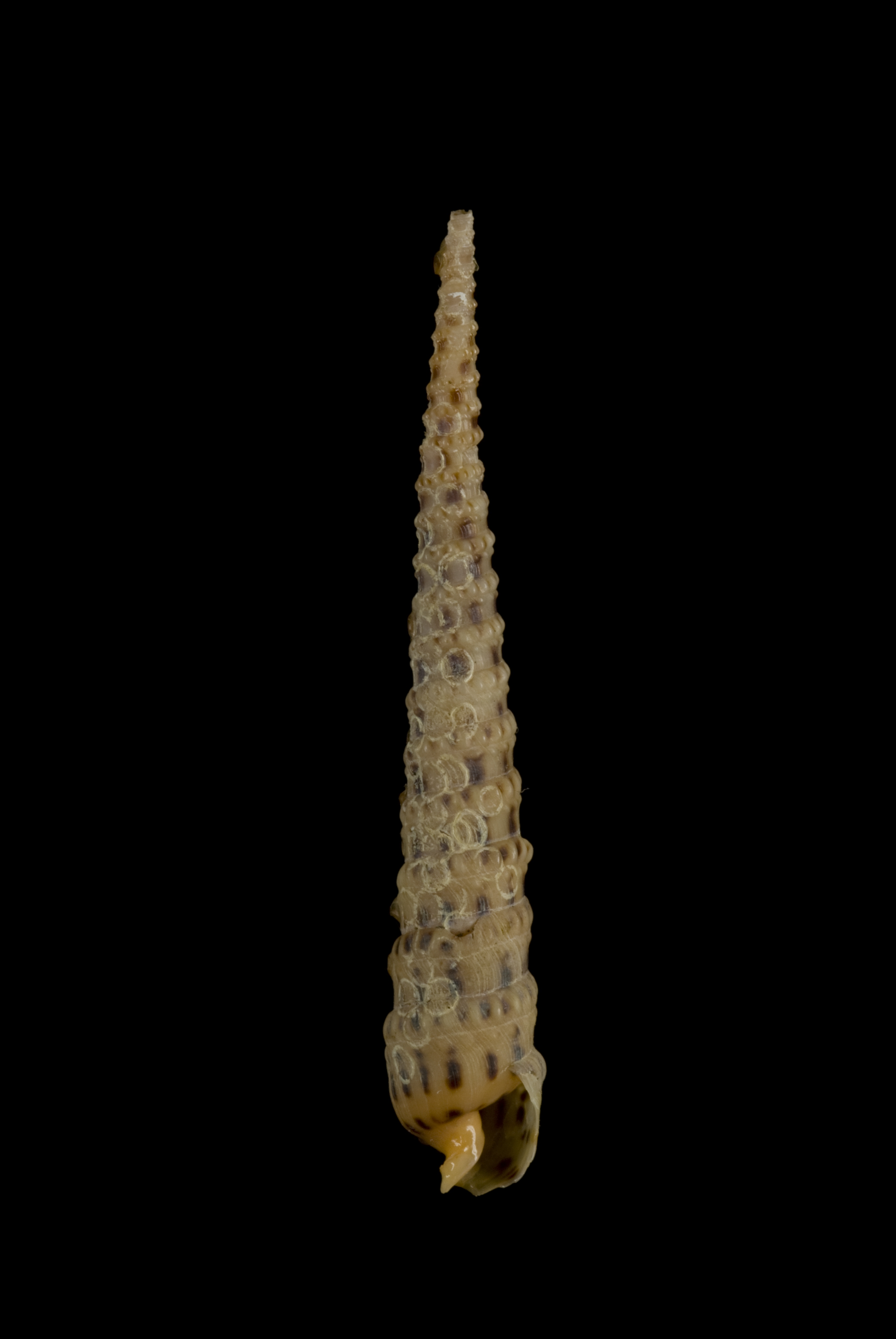
- Shell of Terebra corrugata (specimen at MNHN, Paris)

Scientific classification
- Kingdom: Animalia
- Phylum: Mollusca
- Class: Gastropoda
- Subclass: Caenogastropoda
- Order: Neogastropoda
- Family: Terebridae
- Genus: Terebra
- Species: T. corrugata

Binomial name
- Terebra corrugata Lamarck, 1822

Synonyms
- Terebra bitorquata Deshayes, 1859; Terebra punctata Gray, 1834; Terebra regina Deshayes, 1857

= Terebra corrugata =

Species of gastropod

Terebra corrugata is a species of sea snail, a marine gastropod mollusc in the family Terebridae, the auger snails.

== Distribution ==
This marine species occurs off São Tomé and Príncipe. It lives buried in sand from low tide to 75 m.
