= Terebra bellanodosa =

Scientific classification
- Kingdom: Animalia
- Phylum: Mollusca
- Class: Gastropoda
- Subclass: Caenogastropoda
- Order: Neogastropoda
- Superfamily: Conoidea
- Family: Terebridae
- Genus: Terebra
- Species: T. bellanodosa

Binomial name
- Terebra bellanodosa Grabau & S. G. King, 1928

Synonyms
- Duplicaria bellanodosa (Grabau & King, 1928); Pristiterebra milelinae (Aubry, 1999); Terebra milelinae Aubry, 1999

Species of gastropod

Terebra bellanodosa is a species of sea snail, a marine gastropod mollusk in the family Terebridae, the auger snails.
