= Terebra guineensis =

Scientific classification
- Kingdom: Animalia
- Phylum: Mollusca
- Class: Gastropoda
- Subclass: Caenogastropoda
- Order: Neogastropoda
- Family: Terebridae
- Genus: Terebra
- Species: T. guineensis

Binomial name
- Terebra guineensis Bouchet, 1982

Synonyms
- Cinguloterebra guinenesis (Bouchet, 1983); Triplostephanus guineensis (Bouchet, 1983)

Species of gastropod

Terebra guineensis is a species of sea snail, a marine gastropod mollusc in the family Terebridae, the auger snails.
