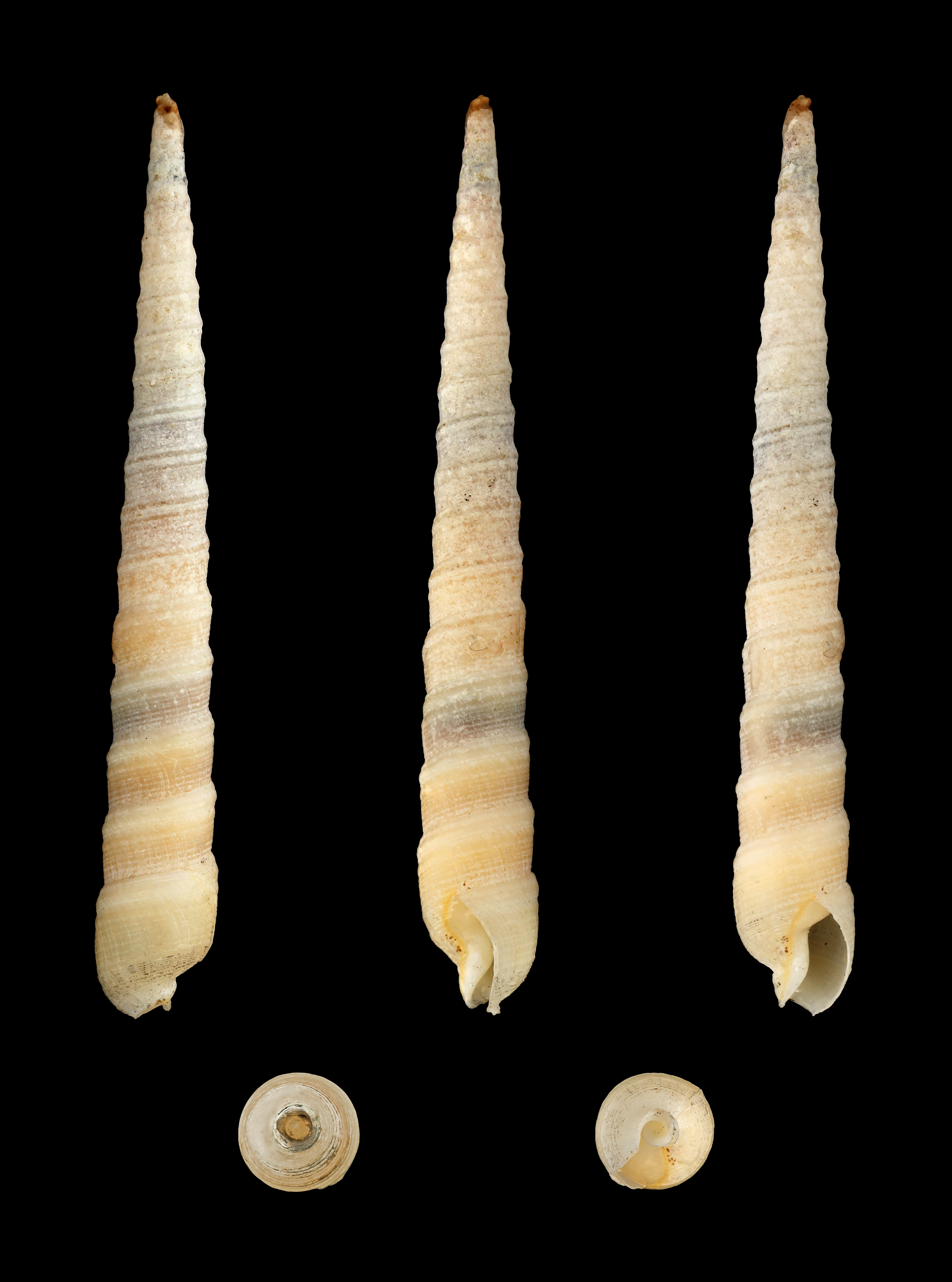

Scientific classification
- Kingdom: Animalia
- Phylum: Mollusca
- Class: Gastropoda
- Subclass: Caenogastropoda
- Order: Neogastropoda
- Family: Terebridae
- Genus: Terebra
- Species: T. laevigata

Binomial name
- Terebra laevigata Gray, 1834

Synonyms
- Dimidacus laevigata (Gray, 1834); Terebra cingulifera laevigata Gray, 1834; Terebra stylus Dall, 1908

= Terebra laevigata =

Species of gastropod

Terebra laevigata is a species of sea snail, a marine gastropod mollusc in the family Terebridae, the auger snails.

== Distribution ==
This marine species occurs off Papua New Guinea.
