= Neoterebra crassireticula =

Scientific classification
- Kingdom: Animalia
- Phylum: Mollusca
- Class: Gastropoda
- Subclass: Caenogastropoda
- Order: Neogastropoda
- Family: Terebridae
- Genus: Neoterebra
- Species: N. crassireticula

Binomial name
- Neoterebra crassireticula (Simone, 1999)

Synonyms
- Terebra crassireticula Simone, 1999; Terebra crassireticulata [sic] (misspelling); Terebra reticulata Simone & Verissimo, 1995 (non J. de C. Sowerby, 1840)

Species of gastropod

Neoterebra crassireticula is a species of sea snail, a marine gastropod mollusk in the family Terebridae, the auger snails.
