= Jean René Constant Quoy =

French naval surgeon, zoologist and anatomist

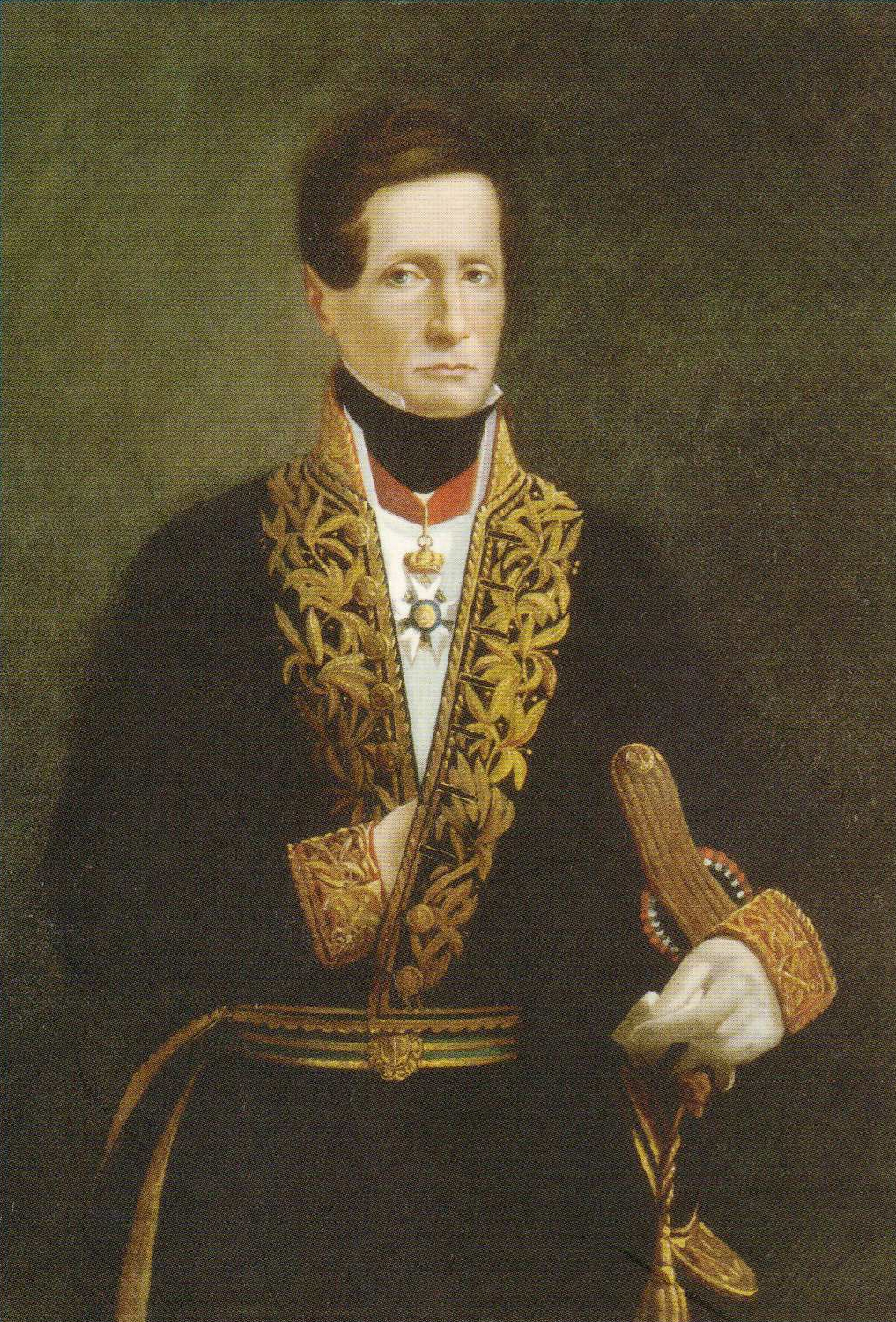
- Born: 10 November 1790; Maillé, Vendée, France
- Died: 4 July 1869 (aged 78); Rochefort, France
- Scientific career
- Fields: zoologist anatomist
- Workplaces: Rochefort Naval School
- Author abbrev. (zoology): Quoy

Jean René Constant Quoy (French pronunciation: [ʒɑ̃ ʁəne kɔ̃stɑ̃ kwa]; 10 November 1790 in Maillé – 4 July 1869 in Rochefort) was a French naval surgeon, zoologist and anatomist.

In 1806, he began his medical studies at the school of naval medicine at Rochefort, afterwards serving as an auxiliary-surgeon on a trip to the Antilles (1808–1809). After earning his medical doctorate in 1814 at Montpellier, he was surgeon-major on a journey to Réunion (1814–1815).

Along with Joseph Paul Gaimard, he served as naturalist and surgeon aboard the Uranie under Louis de Freycinet from 1817 to 1820, and on the Astrolabe (1826–1829) under the command of Jules Dumont d'Urville. In July 1823 he and Gaimard presented a paper to the Académie royale des Sciences on the origin of coral reefs, taking issue with the then widespread belief that these were constructed by coral polyps from bases in very deep water and arguing instead that the original bases must have been in shallow water because reef-building polyps were confined to water depths of just a few tens of metres. Their work was quoted by Charles Darwin in his seminal monograph on the origin on reefs and atolls. While on the Astrolabe expedition Quoy and Gaimard collected and described Tachygia microlepis, the now extinct giant skink of Tonga.

Along with his skills as a naturalist, Quoy was acclaimed for his work as an artist.

In 1824, he was appointed professor of anatomy at the Rochefort Naval School, where from 1832 to 1835, he was a professor of medicine. He then continued his career at naval hospitals in Toulon (1835–1837) and in Brest (1838–1848), afterwards being chosen inspector general of the Naval Bureau of Medicine and Surgery (serving from 1848 to 1858).

== Taxonomy ==
The following genera or species were named in his honor:

- Cracticus quoyi Lesson, 1827 – the black butcherbird
- Quoya Labbé, 1934 – a genus of sea slugs
- Quoyia A. Gray, 1839 – a genus of extinct marine gastropods
- Terebra quoygaimardi Cernohorsky, 1976 – a species of sea snail
- Pilumnus quoyi H. Milne-Edwards, 1834 – a species of crab
- Ischnochiton quoyanus J. Thiele, 1910 – a species of chiton
- Eulamprus quoyii A.M.C. Duméril & Bibron, 1839 – a species of skink
- Quoya Gaudich. – a genus of Australian plants

== Writings ==
- Voyage autour du monde … pendant les années 1817, 1818, 1819 et 1820. (with Louis Claude Desaulses de Freycinet, Joseph Paul Gaimard, Charles Gaudichaud-Beaupré, et al.).
- Voyage de la corvette l'Astrolabe exécuté par ordre du Roi, pendant les années 1826-1827-1828-1829 sous le commandement de M. J. Dumont d'Urville. (with Jules-Sébastien-César Dumont d'Urville, J Tastu and Joseph Paul Gaimard).

== Sources ==
- Mearns, Barbara; Mearns, Richard (1998). The Bird Collectors. Cambridge, Massachusetts: Academic Press. pp. 472. ISBN 0-12-487440-1.

== See also ==
- Category:Taxa named by Jean René Constant Quoy
