= Walter Oliver Cernohorsky =

Czech-New Zealand malacologist (1927–2014)

- Cernohorsky at the Auckland War Memorial Museum with Terebra shells, January 1987
- Born: Walter Oliver Černohorský; 30 June 1927; Brno, Czechoslovakia
- Died: 23 September 2014 (aged 87); Middlemore Hospital, Auckland, New Zealand
- Resting place: Purewa Cemetery, Auckland, New Zealand
- Citizenship: New Zealand
- Scientific career
- Fields: Malacology
- Institutions: Fiji Museum; National Museum of Natural History; Auckland War Memorial Museum

Walter Oliver Cernohorsky (30 June 1927 – 23 September 2014), often referred to as W. O. Cernohorsky, was a Czech malacologist based in New Zealand. Cernohorsky developed an interest in malacology while working as the chief surveyor at the Emperor Gold Mine at Vatukoula, Fiji, publishing scholarly papers on molluscs from 1964. From 1969 to 1988, Cernohorsky worked as the malacologist for Auckland War Memorial Museum.

Cernohorsky became a leading authority on the mollusc families Mitridae, Nassariidae, Terebridae and Costellariidae, and described over 70 species, as well as the genera Dibaphimitra, Domiporta and Neocancilla.

== Early life ==
Cernohorsky was born on 30 June 1927 in Brno, then a part of Czechoslovakia, to Jan Černohorský, a hotelier, and Maria (née Marková). Both of his parents died when he was seven years old, after which he was cared for by his older brother and sister-in-law. Cernohorsky experienced Czechoslovakia under German occupation during World War II, during which his family's hotel was requisitioned, and Cernohorsky's uncle, an officer in the Czech army, was executed by the German Army.

After the war, Cernohorsky studied architecture at university in Czechoslovakia. An outspoken person, Cernohorsky fled Czechoslovakia by train in 1948, after being warned that communist authorities were searching for him. Due to Cernohorsky's language abilities (being able to speak Czech, German, English and some Russian), he was employed as a translator by the United States Army, living in Germany and Italy.

In 1949, Cernohorsky left Italy, travelling to Australia as a refugee, where he worked in factories, brick-works, in Queensland cutting sugar cane and as a surveyor. While working on the Great Barrier Reef in the same year, Cernohorsky happened to discover a chambered nautilus, which inspired his interest in mollusc shells. Cernohorsky's interest in photography led to an interest in photographing shells, after being impressed at the vivid colours that could be captured in Kodachrome slides. Over time, Cernohorsky's passion for photography waned in favour of focusing on shell collecting. After his first two years in Australia, which Cernohorsky described as "forced labour" for the Australian government, he began working at the Golden Plateau Mine in Cracow, Queensland.

Cernohorsky moved to Fiji in 1953, where he became the chief surveyor at the Emperor Gold Mine at Vatukoula. The following year, Cernohorsky began pursuing his passion for tropical molluscs, He became an honorary malacologist at the Fiji Museum, where he met Franz Alfred Schilder, who mentored Cernohorsky in the scientific practices of malacology. Cernohorsky later became the honorary curator of conchology at the Fiji Museum.

An early major discovery of Cernohorsky's was specimens of Blasicrura summersi (then Cypraea summersi) in the waters surrounding Fiji; extending the range for a species which had previously been considered endemic to Tonga. While living in Fiji, Cernohorsky learnt how to free dive in order to collect shells, and became a member of both the Hawaiian Malacological Society and the Fiji Shell Club, writing for both organisations' publications, Hawaiian Shell News and Fiji Shell News.

== Career ==
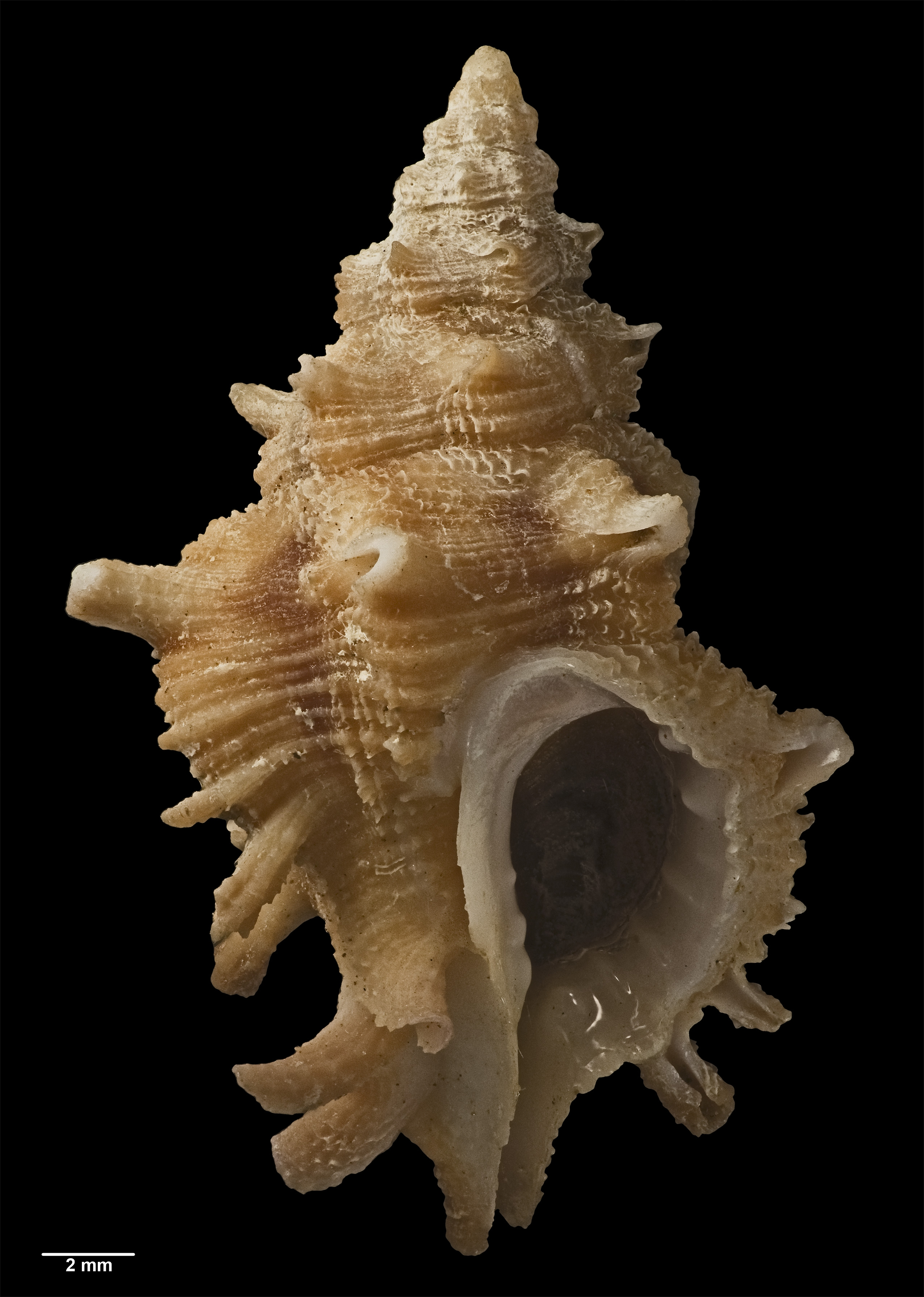
Attiliosa orri (originally Muricopsis orri), a species first described by Cernohorsky in 1976

Cernohorsky became a member of the Malacological Society of Australia in 1964, and began publishing scientific articles on malacology in the same year. In 1967, Cernohorsky published Marine Shells of the Pacific, a compendium of common marine shells found across the Pacific Ocean. Cernohorsky released a second volume of the work in 1972, which described approximately 600 shells of gastropods, molluscs and cephalopods. In 1968, he designed three shell-themed stamps issued in Fiji.

In 1967, Cernohorsky was appointed as the conchologist of the Auckland War Memorial Museum, continuing to work as the chief surveyor of the Emperor Gold Mine until 1968. Prior to starting at the museum, he travelled to Washington D.C. in 1968, where he held a six-month research associateship at the Department of Mollusks of the National Museum of Natural History. Cernohorsky arrived in New Zealand in early February 1969, began his role at the museum immediately after arriving on 3 February 1969. Later that year on 16 July 1969, the museum changed Cernohorsky's title from museum conchologist to museum malacologist.

As a part of his work, Cernohorsky took field trips to Pacific islands, and took part in the Royal Society of New Zealand's 1977 South Pacific Expedition to the Lau Islands with entomologist Keith Wise. In 1981, Cernohorsky undertook field work in Australia, and in 1983 spent two weeks at the Natural History Museum of Los Angeles County, researching Terebridae with malacologist Twila Bratcher. In 1983, Cernohorsky travelled to Portugal to advise on the establishment of a malacology museum.

Cernohorsky and Powell's work led the Auckland War Memorial Museum to become a centre for malacological research, with Cernohorsky becoming a world authority on the mollusc families Mitridae, Nassariidae, Terebridae and Costellariidae. He actively published articles in the Records of the Auckland Institute and Museum, and published two volumes of the Bulletin of the Auckland Institute and Museum, Systematics of the families Mitridae and Volutomitridae (Mollusca: Gastropoda) (1970) and Systematics of the family Nassariidae (Mollusca: Gastropoda) (1984). Cernohorsky also became the facilitator of the Auckland Shell Club, the conchology club originally established as a section of the Auckland Institute and Museum.

In 1978, Cernohorsky published a monograph on the subfamily Mitrinae. Two years later, Cernohorsky published the third volume of Marine Shells of the Pacific, with the name Tropical Pacific Marine Shells, adding descriptions of an additional 600 species. In collaboration with American malacologist Twila Bratcher, Cernohorsky published Living Terebras of the World (1987), a comprehensive review of the genus Terebra, covering 268 taxa.

Cernohorsky also worked as a philatelist for Auckland Museum as a secondary role, administering the museum's collection of stamps. He retired from the Auckland War Memorial Museum on 13 May 1988.

== Later life ==
After retiring from Auckland War Memorial Museum, Cernohorsky moved to Terranora, New South Wales, later returning to New Zealand to live in Pakuranga, Auckland. Cernohorsky pursued his passions for heraldry, genealogy of aristocracy and digital photography during retirement. He was a longstanding member of the Heraldry Society of New Zealand, publishing articles in the New Zealand Armorist from 1996 to 2004. Cernohorsky became a member of l'Association Conchyliologique de Nouvelle-Caledonie in 1990. Cernohorsky contributed to the editing of the fourth edition of Powell's Native Animals of New Zealand, released in 1998.

Cernohorsky died on 23 September 2014 at Middlemore Hospital in Auckland, New Zealand. He was cremated and his ashes were interred at Purewa Cemetery, Auckland.

== Recognition and legacy ==
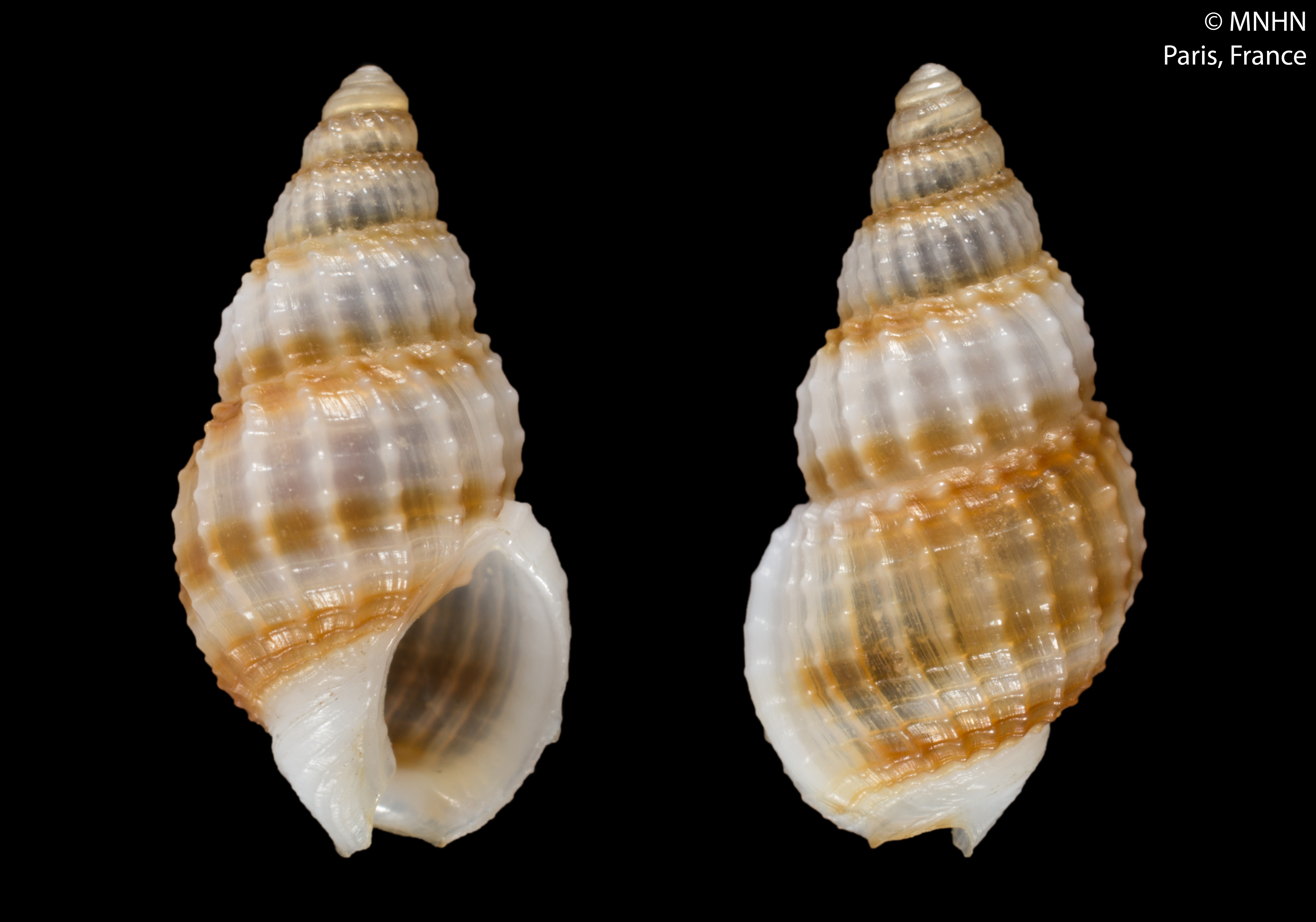
Nassarius cernohorskyi, named in honour of Cernohorsky in 2005

Eight molluscan species have been named after Cernohorsky:

- Austromitra cernohorskyi H. Turner, 2008
- Carinapex cernohorskyi S.G. Wiedrick, 2015
- Cyllene cernohorskyi F. Fernandes & Rolán, 1992
- Hastula cernohorskyi R. D. Burch, 1965
- Imbricaria cernohorskyi (Rehder & B. R. Wilson, 1975)
- Morula cernohorskyi R. Houart & J. Tröndle, 1997
- Nassarius cernohorskyi H.H. Kool, 2005
- Vexillum cernohorskyi Ladd, 1977

Cyllene cernohorskyi, I. cernohorskyi, M. cernohorskyi N. cernohorskyi and V. cernohorskyi were named in Cernohorsky's honour; N. cernohorskyi specifically due to Cernohorsky's pioneering work on the Nassariidae family. A. cernohorskyi and Carinapex cernohorskyi were named due to Cernohorsky examining the first known shells of their respective species, and for H. cernohorskyi, collecting the shells which first came to the attention of the researcher's attention.

Conus cernohorskyi R. Da Motta, 1983, also named in Cernohorsky's honour, has since been synonymised with Conus metcalfii.

== Personal life ==
Cernohorsky met his wife Irene in Australia while working at the Golden Plateau Mine in Cracow, Queensland. The pair married in 1953. Together they had two children, both born in the mid to late 1950s. While living in Fiji, Cernohorsky would give money to his children for any shells that they found. Cernohorsky's wife Irene died in August 2012.

== Taxa identified by Cernohorsky ==
- Acromargarita deynzeri (Cernohorsky, 1980) (originally Mitra deynzeri)
- Anarithma salisburyi (Cernohorsky, 1978) (originally Mitrolumna salisburyi)
- Attiliosa orri (Cernohorsky, 1976) (originally Muricopsis orri)
- Austromitra lacertosa (Cernohorsky, 1970) (originally Vexillum (Costellaria) nodospiculum)
- Austromitra minutenodosa Cernohorsky, 1980
- Barneystrombus kleckhamae (Cernohorsky, 1971) (originally Strombus (Dolomena) kleckhamae)
- Calcimitra hilli (Cernohorsky, 1976) (originally Mitra hilli)
- Cancilla baeri (H. Turner & Cernohorsky, 2003) (originally Neocancilla baeri)
- Cancilla scrobiculata crosnieri Cernohorsky, 1970
- Conus viola Cernohorsky, 1977
- Costapex martinorum (Cernohorsky, 1986) (originally Vexillum (Costellaria) martinorum)
- Dibaphimitra Cernohorsky, 1970
- Domiporta Cernohorsky, 1970
- Domiporta gloriola (Cernohorsky, 1970) (originally Cancilla gloriola)
- Duplicaria mozambiquensis Bratcher & Cernohorsky, 1982
- Gemmulimitra boucheti (Cernohorsky, 1988) (originally Mitra (Nebularia) boucheti)
- Granulifusus martinorum (Cernohorsky, 1987) (originally Latirus martinorum)
- Imbricaria cloveri (Cernohorsky, 1971) (originally Cancilla (Ziba) cloveri)
- Imbricaria kermadecensis (Cernohorsky, 1978) (originally Ziba kermadecensis)
- Isara pele (Cernohorsky, 1970) (originally Mitra pele)
- Lyria grangei Cernohorsky, 1980
- Metzgeria shirleyi (Cernohorsky, 1980) (originally Boreotrophon shirleyi )
- Microvoluta garrardi Cernohorsky, 1975
- Microvoluta joloensis Cernohorsky, 1970
- Myurella burchi (Bratcher & Cernohorsky, 1982) (originally Terebra burchi)
- Myurella mactanensis (Bratcher & Cernohorsky, 1982) (originally Terebra mactanensis)
- Myurella reunionensis (Bratcher & Cernohorsky, 1985) (originally Terebra reunionensis)
- Myurellopsis parkinsoni (Cernohorsky & Bratcher, 1976) (originally Terebra parkinsoni)
- Nassaria bombax Cernohorsky, 1981
- Nassarius arcus Cernohorsky, 1991
- Nassarius fritzsteiningeri Harzhauser & Cernohorsky, 2011
- Nassarius maccauslandi Cernohorsky, 1984
- Nassarius poupini Cernohorsky, 1992
- Nassarius rehderi Cernohorsky, 1980
- Nassarius reunionensis Cernohorsky, 1988
- Nassarius richeri Cernohorsky, 1992
- Nassarius taurinospeciosus Harzhauser & Cernohorsky, 2011
- Nassarius troendleorum Cernohorsky, 1980
- Nassarius wesselinghi Cernohorsky & Vermeij, 2011
- Nassarius whiteheadae Cernohorsky, 1984
- Nebularia dondani (Cernohorsky, 1985) (originally Mitra dondani)
- Neocancilla Cernohorsky, 1966
- Neocancilla kayae Cernohorsky, 1984
- Neoterebra riosi (Bratcher & Cernohorsky, 1985) (originally Terebra riosi)
- Notadusta clifdenensis (Cernohorsky, 1971) (originally Notoluponia (Notadusta) clifdenensis)
- Peculator baccatus Cernohorsky, 1979
- Pilgrivexillum nodospiculum (Cernohorsky, 1970) (originally Vexillum (Costellaria) nodospiculum)
- Pisania jenningsi (Cernohorsky, 1966) (originally Sukunaia jenningsi)
- Pollia wrightae (Cernohorsky, 1974) (originally Cantharus (Pollia) wrightae)
- Primovula eilatensis Cernohorsky, 1972
- Punctoterebra baileyi (Bratcher & Cernohorsky, 1982) (originally Duplicaria baileyi)
- Purpuradusta hammondae dampierensis F. A. Schilder & Cernohorsky, 1965
- Pusia hansenae (Cernohorsky, 1973) (originally Vexillum (Pusia) hansenae)
- Pusia marrowi (Cernohorsky, 1973) (originally Vexillum (Pusia) marrowi)
- Roseomitra earlei (Cernohorsky, 1977) (originally Mitra (Nebularia) earlei)
- Scabricola backae Cernohorsky, 1973
- Scabricola kingae (Cernohorsky, 1972) (originally Mitra (Nebularia) sowerbyi kingae)
- Scabricola vicdani Cernohorsky, 1981
- Swainsonia ekerae (Cernohorsky, 1973) (originally Scabricola (Swainsonia) ocellata ekerae)
- Terebra bratcherae Cernohorsky, 1987
- Terebra caddeyi Bratcher & Cernohorsky, 1982
- Terebra connelli Bratcher & Cernohorsky, 1985
- Terebra marrowae Bratcher & Cernohorsky, 1982
- Terebra quoygaimardi Cernohorsky & Bratcher, 1976
- Thaluta maxmarrowi (Cernohorsky, 1980) (originally Thala maxmarrowi)
- Tosapusia duplex (Cernohorsky, 1982) (originally Vexillum (Costellaria) duplex)
- Tosapusia kalimnanensis (Cernohorsky, 1970) (originally Vexillum (Costellaria) kalimnanense)
- Tritia signatodentis (Harzhauser & Cernohorsky, 2011) (originally Nassarius signatodentis)
- Vexillena choslenae (Cernohorsky, 1982) (originally Vexillum (Costellaria) choslenae)
- Vexillum adamsianum Cernohorsky, 1978
- Vexillum malleopunctum Cernohorsky, 1981
- Vexillum salisburyi Cernohorsky, 1976
- Vexillum takakuwai Cernohorsky & M. Azuma, 1974 (originally Vexillum (Costellaria) takakuwai)
- Vexillum wolfei Cernohorsky, 1978
- Volutomitra vaubani Cernohorsky, 1982
- Zoila chathamensis (Cernohorsky, 1971) (originally Bernaya chathamensis)

The following taxa have since been synonymised:

- Engina mactanensis, synonymised with Engina spica
- Imbricaria (Sohlia), synonymised with Trochactaeon
- Microvoluta ponderi, synonymised with Microvoluta miranda
- Morula parvissima, synonymised with Morula nodicostata
- Nassarius (Cryptonassarius), synonymised with Tritia
- Sukunaia, synonymised with Pisania
- Terebra pseudopertusa, synonymised with Maculauger kokiy
- Viriola samoana, synonymised with Viriola abbotti

== Selected works ==
- Cernohorsky, Walter O. (1967), Marine Shells of the Pacific, Sydney: Pacific Publications, OCLC 548502, Wikidata Q136327900
- Cernohorsky, W. O. (1970). "Systematics of the families Mitridae and Volutomitridae (Mollusca: Gastropoda)". Bulletin of the Auckland Institute and Museum. 8. ISSN 0067-0456. OCLC 696235. Wikidata Q115112302.
- Cernohorsky, W. O. (1971). "The Family Naticidae (Mollusca: Gastropoda) in the Fiji Islands". Records of the Auckland Institute and Museum. 8: 169–208. ISSN 0067-0464. JSTOR 42906168. Wikidata Q58676897.
- Cernohorsky, W. O. (1971). "Indo-Pacific Pisaniinae (Mollusca: Gastropoda) and Related Buccinid Genera". Records of the Auckland Institute and Museum. 8: 137–167. ISSN 0067-0464. JSTOR 42906167. Wikidata Q58676894.
- Cernohorsky, Walter O. (1972). Marine Shells of the Pacific, Volume II. Sydney: Pacific Publications. ISBN 0-85807-004-9. OCLC 28991642. Wikidata Q136327915.
- Cernohorsky, Walter O. (1978). Tropical Pacific Marine Shells. Sydney, New York City: Pacific Publications. ISBN 0-85807-038-3. OCLC 6719387. Wikidata Q136327924.
- Cernohorsky, W. O. (1984). "Systematics of the family Nassariidae (Mollusca: Gastropoda)". Bulletin of the Auckland Institute and Museum. 14. ISSN 0067-0456. LCCN 86101164. OCLC 16358067. Wikidata Q115120219.
- Bratcher, Twila; Cernohorsky, Walter O. (1987). Abbott, R. Tucker (ed.). Living Terebras of the World. Melbourne: American Malacologists. ISBN 0-915826-16-X. OCLC 15344519. Wikidata Q136327945.
- Powell, A. W. B.; Gill, B. J.; Cernohorsky, Walter O.; Stephenson, A. B.; Wise, K. A. J. (1998). Powell's Native Animals of New Zealand (4th ed.). Auckland: David Bateman Ltd. ISBN 978-1-86953-393-9. LCCN 98198615. OCLC 46519148. Wikidata Q115733370.

== Bibliography ==
- Thwaites, Ian (2015). A Good Place to Be: Auckland Museum People 1929–89. Ian Thwaites. ISBN 978-0-473-32932-7. OCLC 927167353. Wikidata Q64995662.
