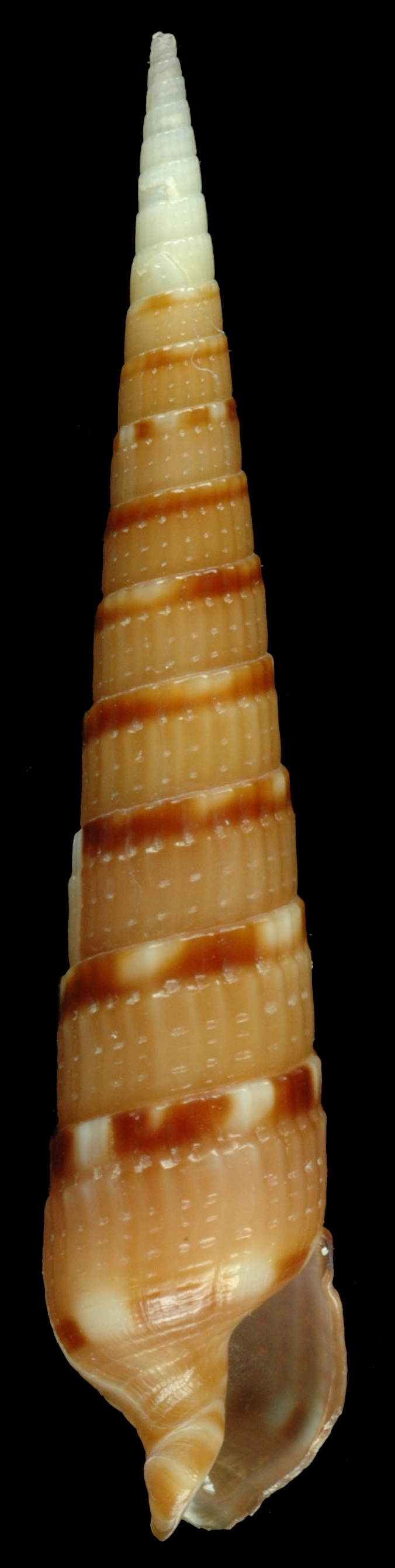
- Shell of Maculauger alveolatus (specimen at MNHN, Paris)

Scientific classification
- Kingdom: Animalia
- Phylum: Mollusca
- Class: Gastropoda
- Subclass: Caenogastropoda
- Order: Neogastropoda
- Family: Terebridae
- Genus: Maculauger; Fedosov, Malcolm, Terryn, Gorson, Modica, Holford & Puillandre, 2020

Type species
- Terebra pseudopertusa Bratcher & Cernohorsky, 1985

= Maculauger =

Genus of gastropods

Maculauger is a genus of marine snails, gastropod mollusks in the family Terebridae, subfamily Terebrinae.

== Species ==
Species within the genus Maculauger include:

- Maculauger alveolatus (Hinds, 1844)
- Maculauger campbelli (R. D. Burch, 1965)
- Maculauger castigatus (A. H. Cooke, 1885)
- Maculauger cinctellus (Deshayes, 1859)
- Maculauger kokiy Pacaud & Lesport, 2020
- Maculauger minipulcher (Bozzetti, 2008)
- Maculauger sudchinensis Malcolm, Terryn & Fedosov, 2020

Species brought into synonymy

- Maculauger pseudopertusus (Bratcher & Cernohorsky, 1985): synonym of Maculauger kokiy Pacaud & Lesport, 2020
