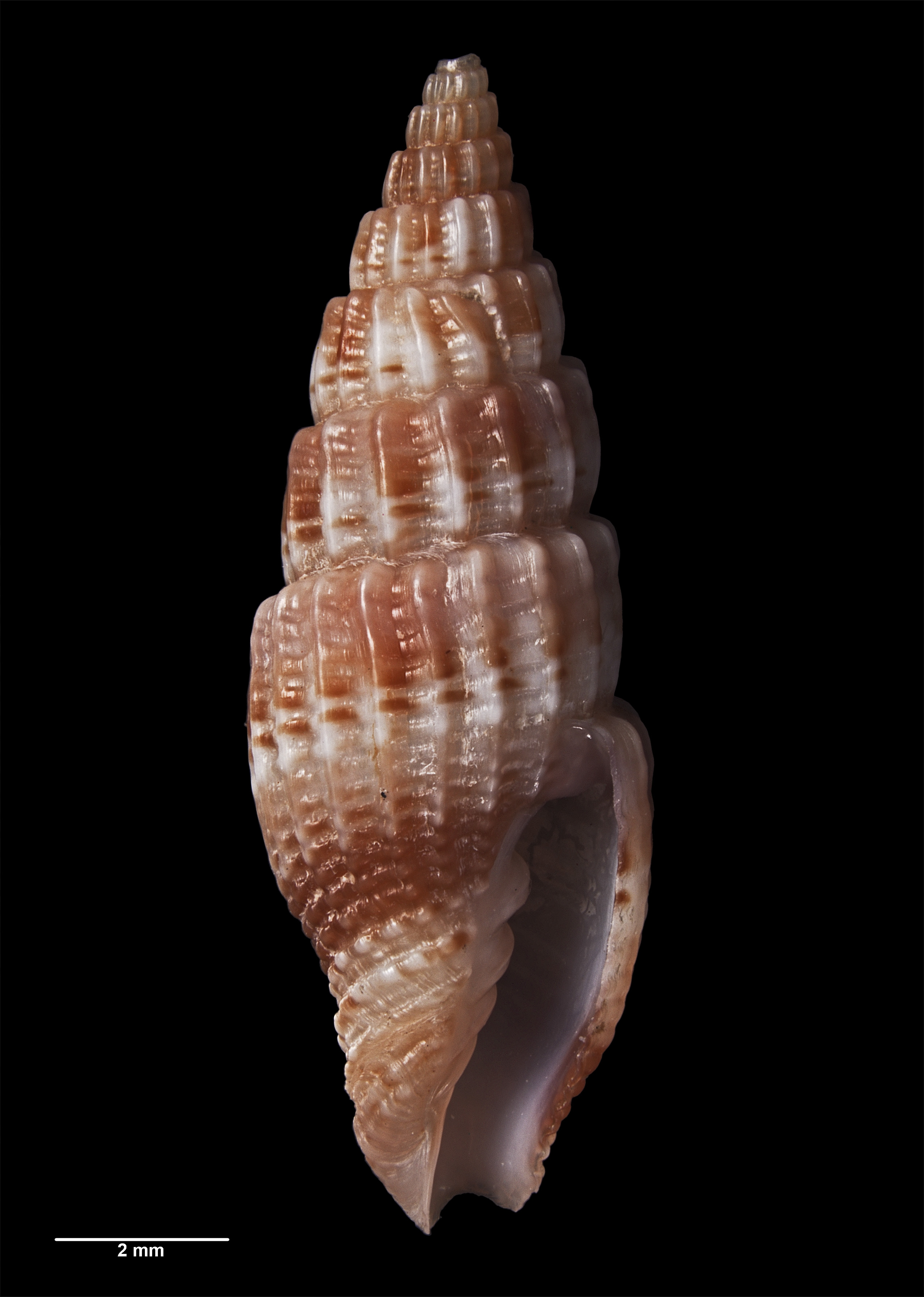
- Holotype

Scientific classification
- Kingdom: Animalia
- Phylum: Mollusca
- Class: Gastropoda
- Subclass: Caenogastropoda
- Order: Neogastropoda
- Superfamily: Turbinelloidea
- Family: Costellariidae
- Genus: Vexillum
- Species: V. adamsianum

Binomial name
- Vexillum adamsianum Cernohorsky, 1978

Synonyms
- Vexillum (Costellaria) adamsianum Cernohorsky, 1978

= Vexillum adamsianum =

Species of gastropod

Vexillum adamsianum is a species of small sea snail, marine gastropod mollusk in the family Costellariidae, the ribbed miters.

== Description ==
The shell is small, between 8–17 mm (0.31–0.67 in) in length. The shell often appears in white with red-brown or purple-brown blotch. The Aperture (mollusc) is pink to purple inside.

== Distribution ==
This marine species was found of Hawaii, Tahiti, and Mozambique.

== Trivia ==
The species is named after Mr. Andrew C. Adams from Aiea, Hawaii, to honor his contributions to the study.
