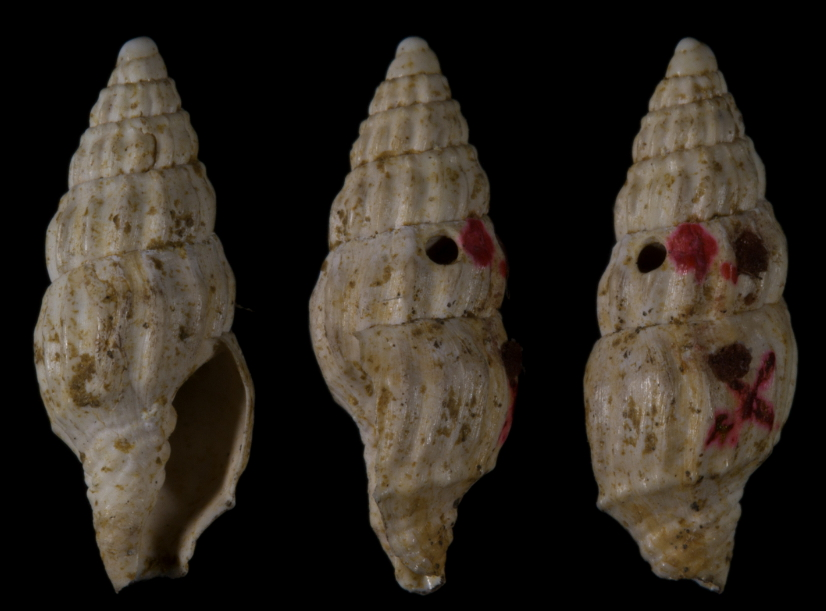
- Shell of † Austromitra lacertosa (specimen at MNHN, Paris)

Scientific classification
- Kingdom: Animalia
- Phylum: Mollusca
- Class: Gastropoda
- Subclass: Caenogastropoda
- Order: Neogastropoda
- Superfamily: Turbinelloidea
- Family: Costellariidae
- Genus: Austromitra
- Species: A. lacertosa

Binomial name
- Austromitra lacertosa (Cernohorsky, 1970)

Synonyms
- † Mitra paucicostata Tate, 1889 (invalid: not Speyer, 1862 (homonym)); † Turricula (Costellaria) paucicostata (Tate, 1889); † Vexillum (Costellaria) lacertosum Cernohorsky, 1970

= Austromitra lacertosa =

Species of gastropod

Austromitra lacertosa is an extinct species of sea snail, a marine gastropod mollusk in the family Costellariidae. It a species known to have lived during the Middle Miocene, which has been found in the state of Victoria in Australia.

== Description ==
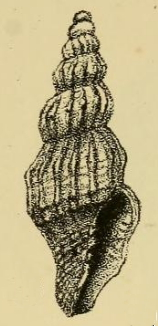
Original illustration by Tate in 1889

Cernohorsky described the species as below:

Shell up to 12.0 mm (0.47 in) in length but frequently smaller, fusiformly-elongate and angulate on the presutural ramp of spire whorls, body whorl bi-angulate, teleoconch of 5 Whorls, protoconch of 1½ smooth embryonic whorls. Sculptured with elevated and angulate axial ribs which are slightly nodose at sutures, spire whorls concave anteriorly to sutures and then descending almost vertically to the next suture. Body whorl with 2-4 strong but ill-defined cords which become nodose at the point of intersection with axial ribs, peripheral cord most prominent, siphonal fasciole with 6-8 strong, crowded oblique cords, interspaces of axial ribs obsoletely spirally striate. Aperture shorter than the spire, lirate within and constricted basally, columella not calloused and with 3-4 oblique folds, siphonal canal produced, siphonal notch distinct.

The four and a half whorls, excluding protoconch, are medially subangulated and ornamented with slightly bent angular ribs, which are subtuberculated on the spiral keel and at each suture (15 on the penultimate whorl). The interspaces are faintly striated transversely. The body whorl is oblong, abruptly attenuated to a short, broad, reverted beak, which is spirally ridged; flatly rounded at the suture, ornamented with acute ribs, a slightly tuberculate antesutural keel, and two approximate tubercular ridges in an alignment with posterior angle of the aperture. The outer lip is thin, roundly insinuated at the suture and internally lirate. The columella shows four stout approximate plaits.

== Taxonomy ==
The species was first described as Mitra paucicostata in 1889 by Ralph Tate. In 1970, Walter Oliver Cernohorsky gave the species the provisional name Vexillum (Costellaria) lacertosum, after finding that the name given by Reeve was invalid name due to a different species being described using this name in 1862 by Otto Wilhelm Carl Speyer. In 1979, Cernohorsky recombined the species as Austromitra lacertosa, the currently accepted name.

== Distribution ==
Fossils of this marine species date to the Middle Miocene, and have been found in lower beds of the Muddy Creek Formation in Victoria, Australia, with paratypes found in blue clays at Schnapper Point in Mornington, Victoria.
