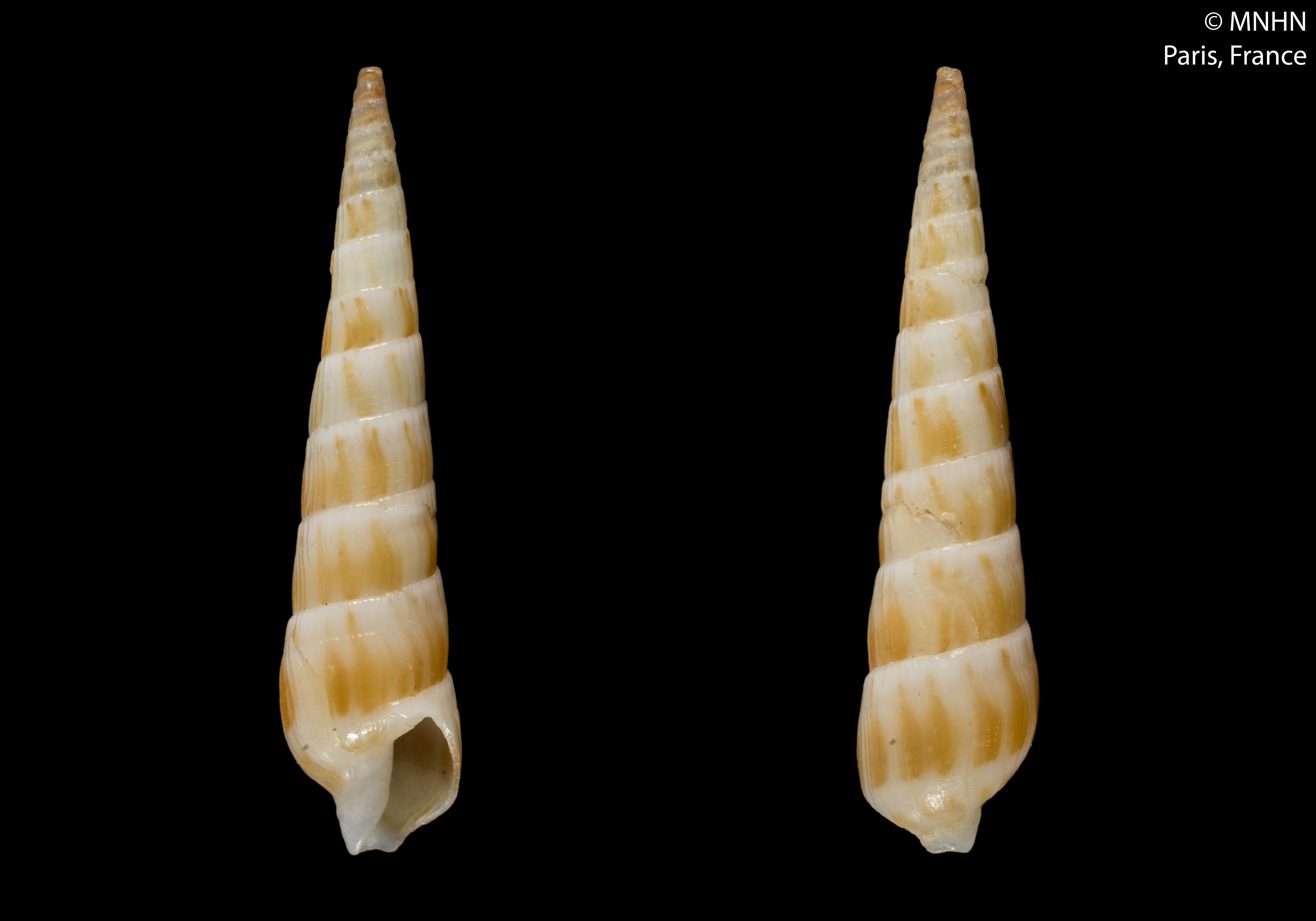
- Shell of Maculauger minipulcher (specimen at MNHN, Paris)

Scientific classification
- Kingdom: Animalia
- Phylum: Mollusca
- Class: Gastropoda
- Subclass: Caenogastropoda
- Order: Neogastropoda
- Superfamily: Conoidea
- Family: Terebridae
- Genus: Maculauger
- Species: M. minipulcher

Binomial name
- Maculauger minipulcher Bozzetti, 2008

Synonyms
- Hastulopsis minipulchra (Bozzetti, 2008); Myurella minipulchra Bozzetti, 2008 (basionym)

= Maculauger minipulcher =

Species of gastropod

Maculauger minipulcher is a species of sea snail, a marine gastropod mollusk in the family Terebridae, the auger snails.

== Description ==
The length of the shell varies between 7 mm and 20 mm.

== Distribution ==
This marine species occurs off Southern Madagascar.
