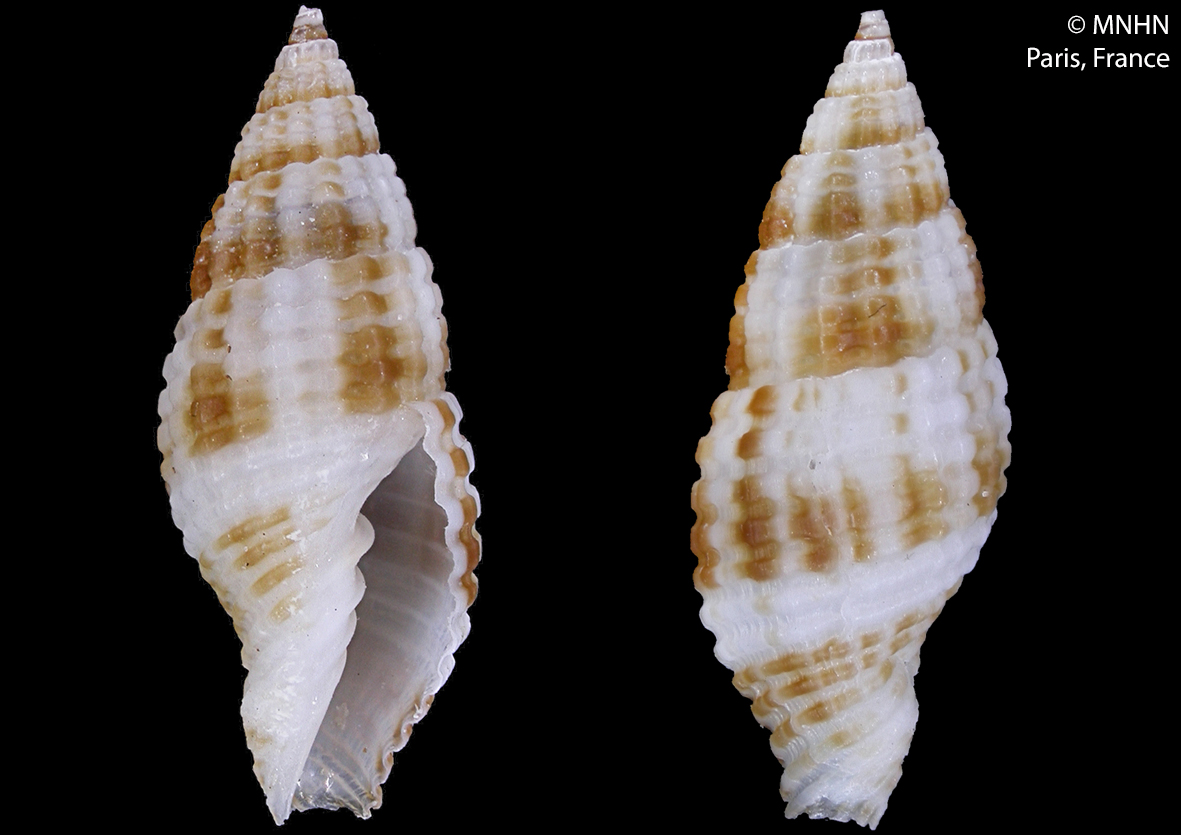
- Shell of Costapex margaritatus (holotype at MNHN, Paris)

Scientific classification
- Kingdom: Animalia
- Phylum: Mollusca
- Class: Gastropoda
- Subclass: Caenogastropoda
- Order: Neogastropoda
- Superfamily: Turbinelloidea
- Family: Costellariidae
- Genus: Costapex
- Species: C. margaritatus

Binomial name
- Costapex margaritatus Herrmann, Fedosov & Bouchet, 2017

= Costapex margaritatus =

Species of gastropod

Costapex margaritatus is a species of sea snail, a marine gastropod mollusk, in the family Costellariidae, the ribbed miters.

== Distribution ==
This species occurs in Philippines.
