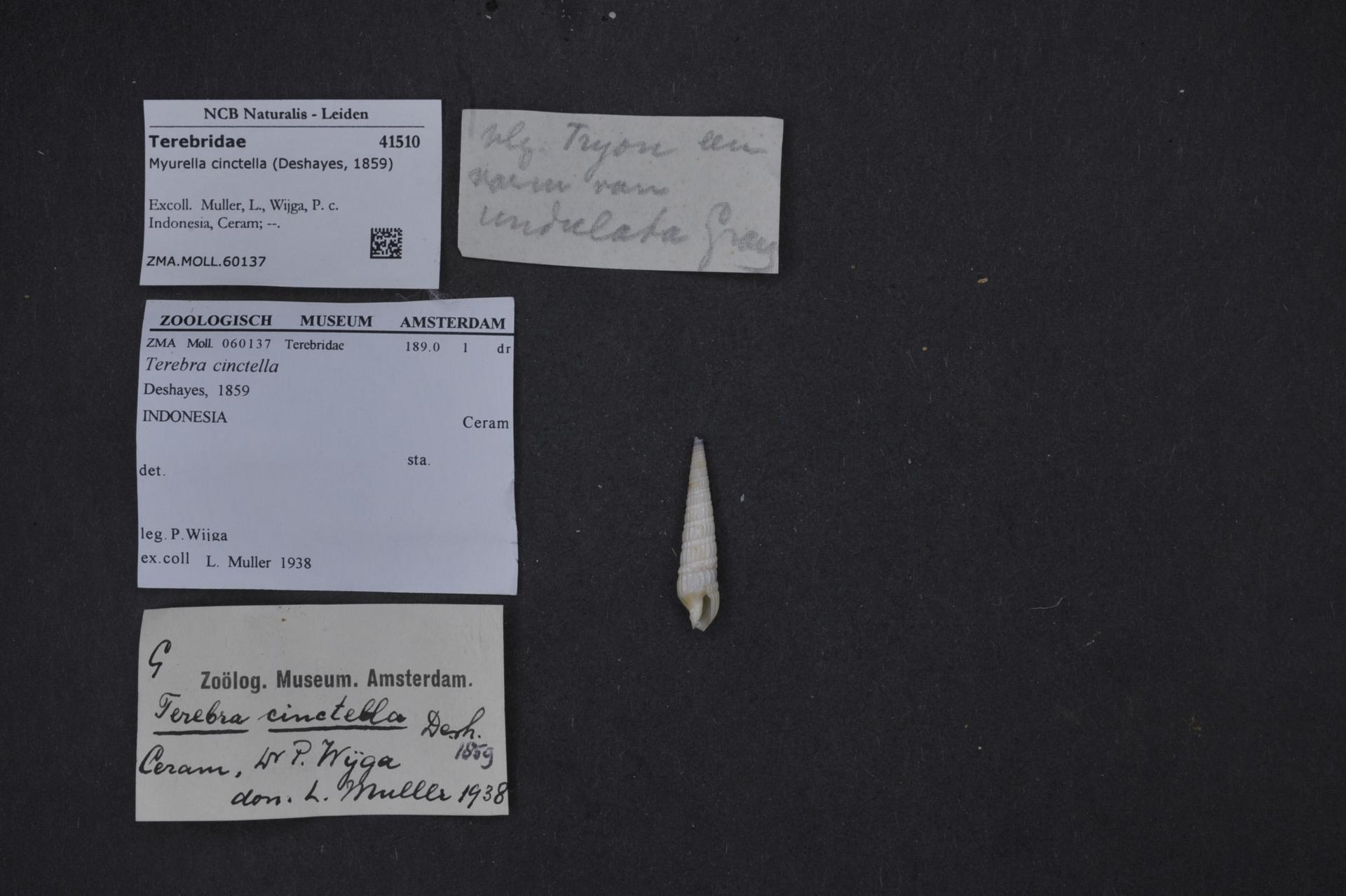

Scientific classification
- Kingdom: Animalia
- Phylum: Mollusca
- Class: Gastropoda
- Subclass: Caenogastropoda
- Order: Neogastropoda
- Superfamily: Conoidea
- Family: Terebridae
- Genus: Maculauger
- Species: M. cinctellus

Binomial name
- Maculauger cinctellus (Deshayes, 1859)

Synonyms
- Myurella cinctella (Deshayes, 1859); Terebra cinctella Deshayes, 1859

= Maculauger cinctellus =

Species of gastropod

Maculauger cinctellus is a species of sea snail, a marine gastropod mollusk in the family Terebridae, the auger snails.
