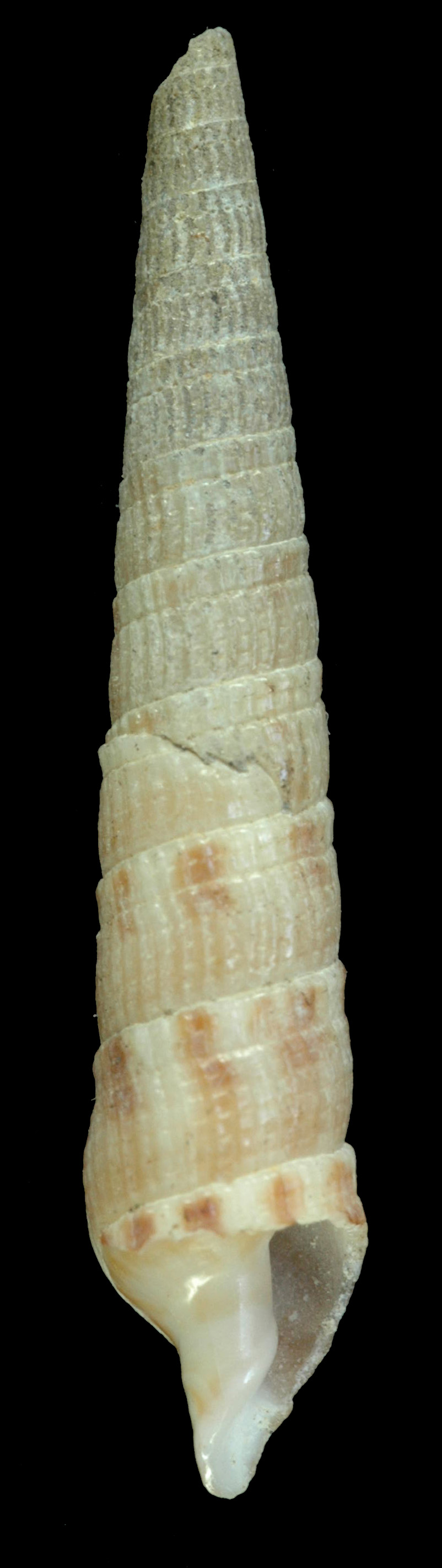
- Shell of Maculauger campbelli (specimen at MNHN, Paris)

Scientific classification
- Kingdom: Animalia
- Phylum: Mollusca
- Class: Gastropoda
- Subclass: Caenogastropoda
- Order: Neogastropoda
- Superfamily: Conoidea
- Family: Terebridae
- Genus: Maculauger
- Species: M. campbelli

Binomial name
- Maculauger campbelli (Burch, 1965)

Synonyms
- Hastulopsis campbelli (R. D. Burch, 1965); Terebra campbelli Burch, 1965

= Maculauger campbelli =

Species of gastropod

Maculauger campbelli is a species of sea snail, a marine gastropod mollusk in the family Terebridae, the auger snails.

== Description ==
The length of the shell varies between 20 mm and 42 mm.

== Distribution ==
This marine species occurs in the South China Sea; off the coasts of Japan, the Philippines, and New Caledonia.
