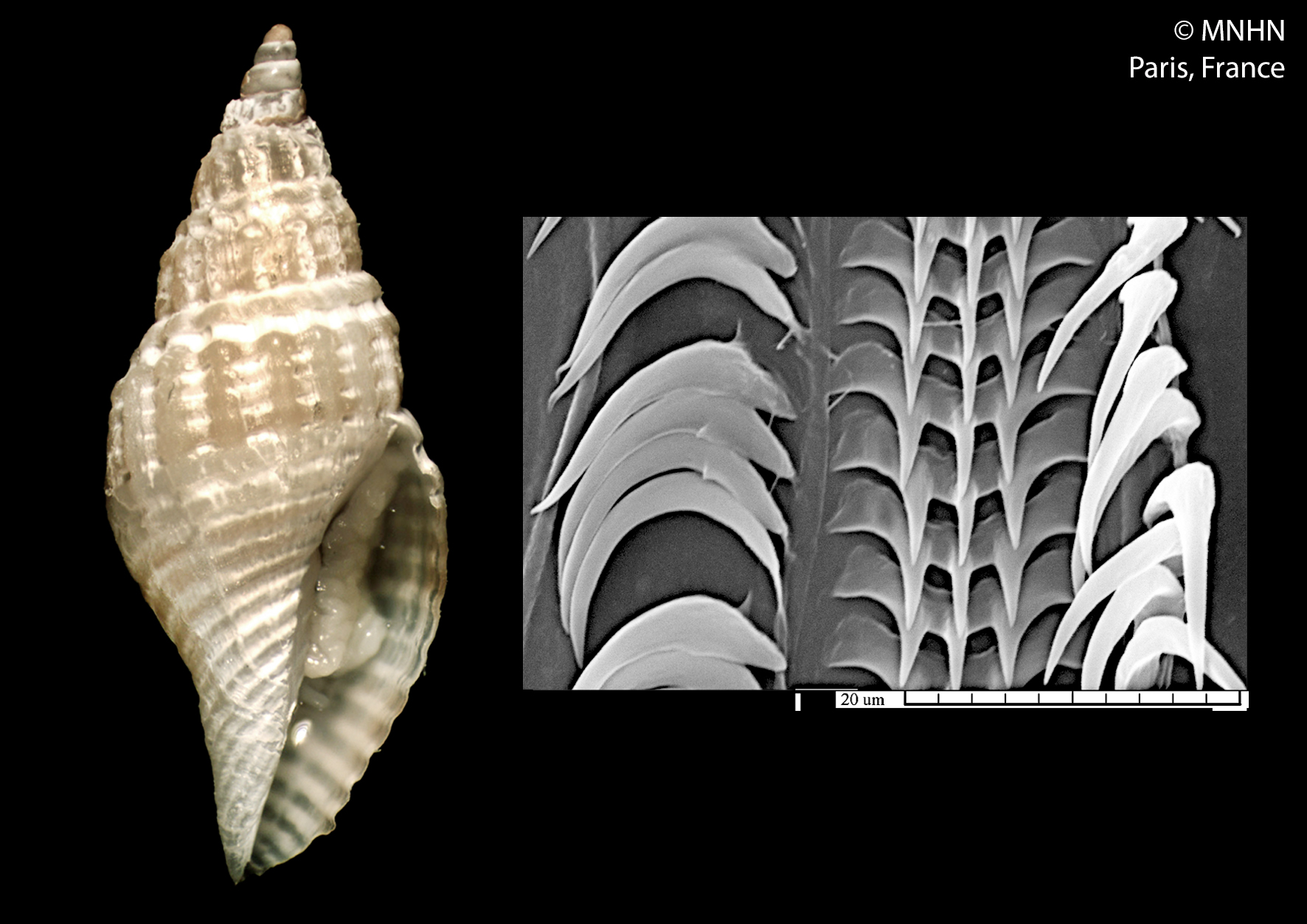
- Shell and radula of Costapex sulcatus

Scientific classification
- Kingdom: Animalia
- Phylum: Mollusca
- Class: Gastropoda
- Subclass: Caenogastropoda
- Order: Neogastropoda
- Superfamily: Turbinelloidea
- Family: Costellariidae
- Genus: Costapex; Fedosov, Herrmann & Bouchet, 2017

Type species
- Costapex sulcatus Fedosov, Herrmann & Bouchet, 2017

= Costapex =

Genus of gastropods

Costapex is a genus of sea snails, marine gastropod mollusks, in the family Costellariidae, the ribbed miters.

== Species ==
Species within the genus Costapex include:

- Costapex ancistrolepis Fedosov, Bouchet, Dekkers, Gori, S.-I Huang, Kantor, Lemarcis, Marrow, Ratti, Rosenberg, R. Salisbury, Zvonareva & Puillandre, 2025
- Costapex baldwinae Harasewych, J. Uribe & Fedosov, 2020
- Costapex dolichosulcatus Fedosov, Bouchet, Dekkers, Gori, S.-I Huang, Kantor, Lemarcis, Marrow, Ratti, Rosenberg, R. Salisbury, Zvonareva & Puillandre, 2025
- Costapex exbodi Fedosov, Herrmann & Bouchet, 2017
- Costapex joliveti (Poppe & Tagaro, 2006)
- Costapex levis Fedosov, Herrmann & Bouchet, 2017
- Costapex margaritatus Herrmann, Fedosov & Bouchet, 2017
- Costapex mariavittoriae Fedosov, Bouchet, Dekkers, Gori, S.-I Huang, Kantor, Lemarcis, Marrow, Ratti, Rosenberg, R. Salisbury, Zvonareva & Puillandre, 2025
- Costapex martinorum (Cernohorsky, 1986)
- Costapex pyramidalis Fedosov, Bouchet, Dekkers, Gori, S.-I Huang, Kantor, Lemarcis, Marrow, Ratti, Rosenberg, R. Salisbury, Zvonareva & Puillandre, 2025
- Costapex ronnyi (Poppe, Tagaro & R. Salisbury, 2009)
- Costapex sulcatus Fedosov, Herrmann & Bouchet, 2017
