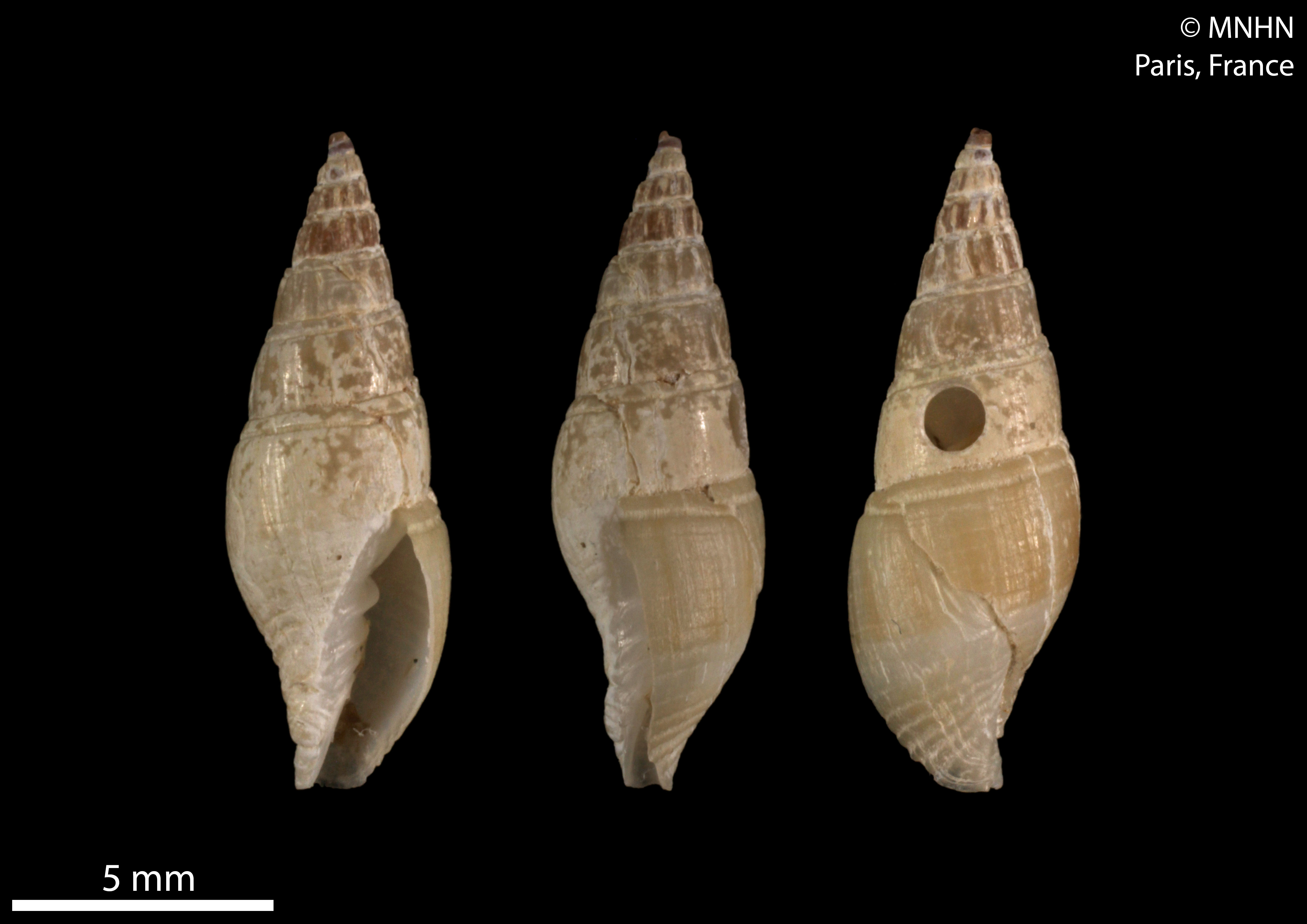
- Shell of Costapex levis (specimen at MNHN, Paris)

Scientific classification
- Kingdom: Animalia
- Phylum: Mollusca
- Class: Gastropoda
- Subclass: Caenogastropoda
- Order: Neogastropoda
- Superfamily: Turbinelloidea
- Family: Costellariidae
- Genus: Costapex
- Species: C. levis

Binomial name
- Costapex levis Fedosov, Herrmann & Bouchet, 2017

= Costapex levis =

Species of gastropod

Costapex levis is a species of sea snail, a marine gastropod mollusk, in the family Costellariidae, the ribbed miters.

== Distribution ==
This species occurs in the following locations:

- Papua New Guinea
- Philippines
- Solomon Islands
