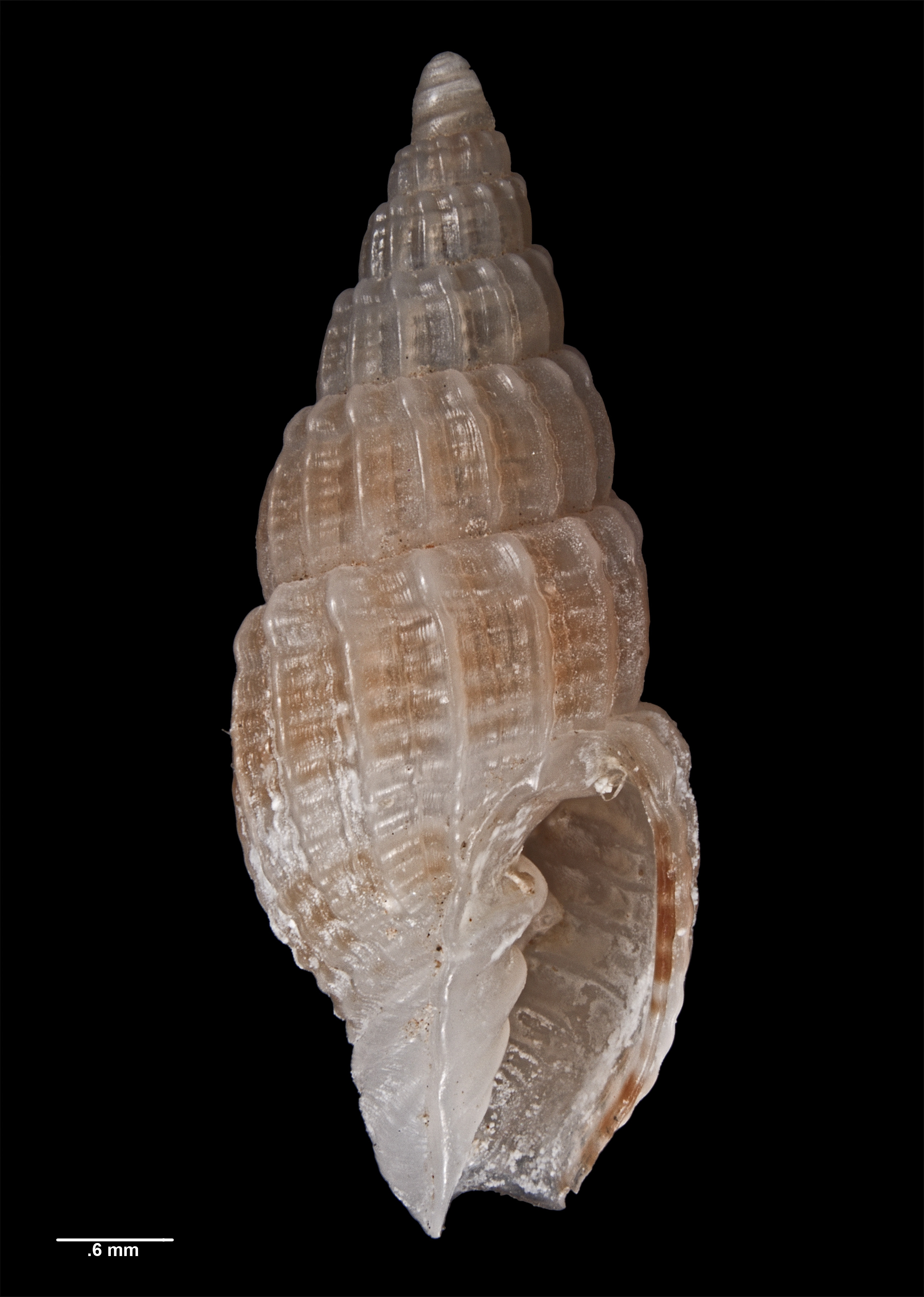
- Holotype

Scientific classification
- Kingdom: Animalia
- Phylum: Mollusca
- Class: Gastropoda
- Subclass: Caenogastropoda
- Order: Neogastropoda
- Superfamily: Turbinelloidea
- Family: Costellariidae
- Genus: Vexillum
- Species: V. wolfei

Binomial name
- Vexillum wolfei Cernohorsky, 1978

Synonyms
- Vexillum (Costellaria) wolfei Cernohorsky, 1978 ·

= Vexillum wolfei =

Species of gastropod

Vexillum wolfei is a species of small sea snail, marine gastropod mollusk in the family Costellariidae, the ribbed miters.

== Description ==
The length of the shell varies between 5 mm and 11.2 mm.

== Distribution ==
This marine species occurs off and is endemic to Hawaii. It has been recorded in areas with a sea surface temperature of 25-30 °C and a sea surface salinity of 30-40 PSU.
