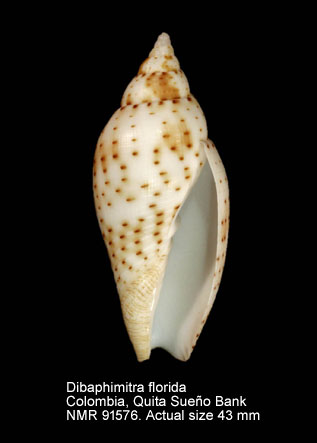
- Dibaphimitra florida

Scientific classification
- Kingdom: Animalia
- Phylum: Mollusca
- Class: Gastropoda
- Subclass: Caenogastropoda
- Order: Neogastropoda
- Superfamily: Mitroidea
- Family: Mitridae
- Genus: Dibaphimitra; Cernohorsky, 1970

Species
- See text

Synonyms
- Mitra (Dibaphimitra) Cernohorsky, 1970

= Dibaphimitra =

Genus of gastropods

Dibaphimitra is a genus of sea snails, marine gastropod mollusks in the family Mitridae. First described in 1970 by Walter Oliver Cernohorsky, the genus has a single extant member, Dibaphimitra florida, found in the Caribbean Sea. One fossil taxon, is also included in Dibaphimitra, D. dennanti.

== Description ==
Dibaphimitra measure between 25–80 mm (0.98–3.15 in) in size, and have an inflated final whorl. Members of the genus have a teleoconch with 4–6 convex whorls, and a protoconch of 1.5–3.5 smooth whorls. The aperture is longer than its spire. The animal is colored milky white with brown irregular blotches.

== Taxonomy ==
The taxon was first described as the subgenus Mitra (Dibaphimitra) in 1970 by New Zealand malacologist Walter Oliver Cernohorsky, who assigned Dibaphimitra florida (then Mitra florida) as the type species. Since publication, Dibaphimitra has been elevated to genus level.

There are two members of the genus, the extant Dibaphimitra florida, which was added to the taxon by Cernohorsky in 1970, and Dibaphimitra dennanti (formerly known as Mitra dennanti and Volutomitra dennanti), a fossil species known from the Muddy Creek Formation of the Otway Basin in Australia. Dibaphimitra janetae, described by Edward James Petuch in 1987, was synonymised with D. florida in 2004.

As of 2018, the genus has not been ascribed to a subfamily within Mitridae.

== Distribution ==
While living members of genus are found in the Caribbean Sea, fossil shells of the genus have been found since the Miocene in a much wider area, including Australia.

== Species ==
Species within the genus Dibaphimitra include:

- Dibaphimitra dennanti (Tate, 1889) †
- Dibaphimitra florida (Gould, 1856)
