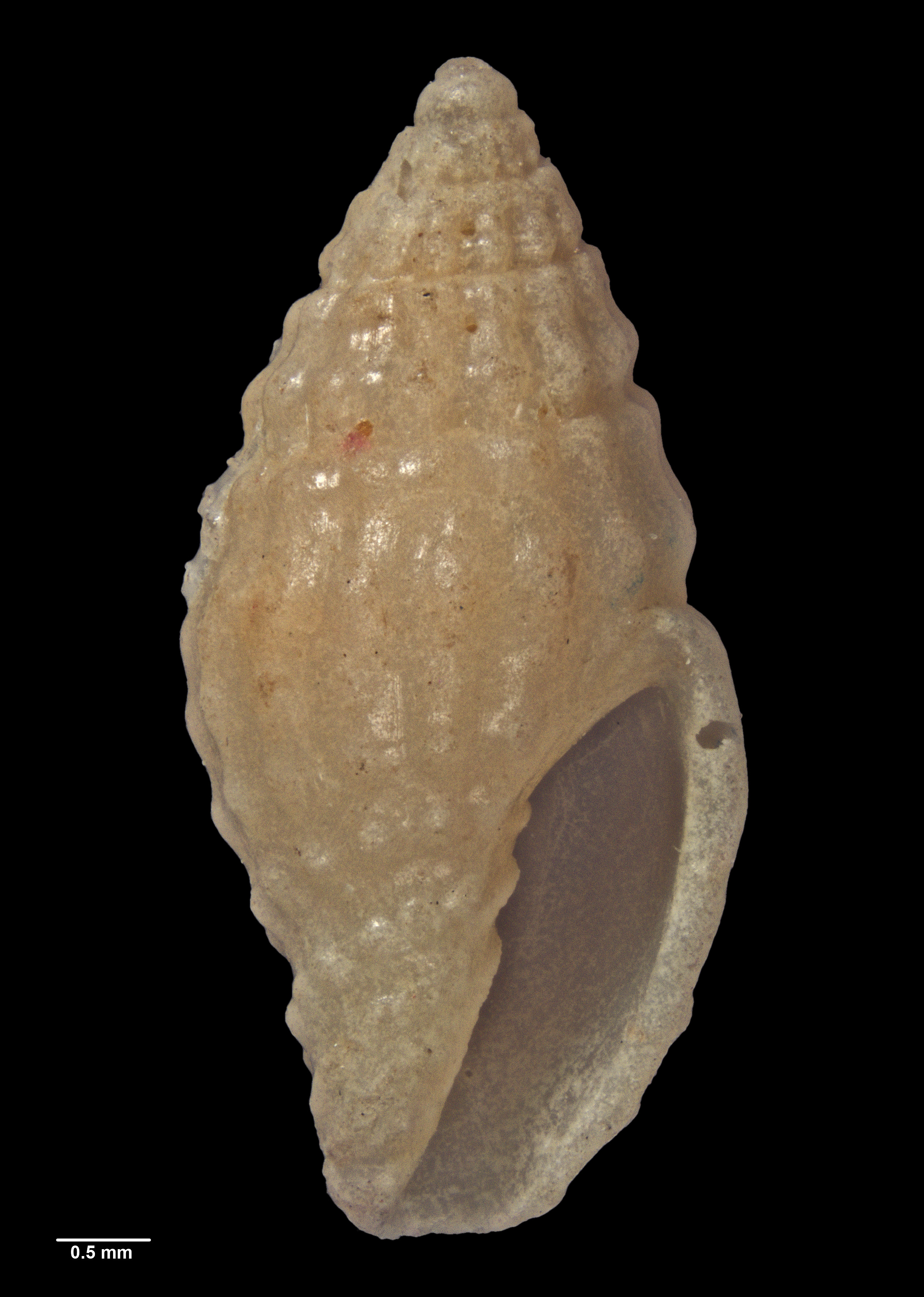

Scientific classification
- Kingdom: Animalia
- Phylum: Mollusca
- Class: Gastropoda
- Subclass: Caenogastropoda
- Order: Neogastropoda
- Family: Volutomitridae
- Genus: Peculator
- Species: P. baccatus

Binomial name
- Peculator baccatus Cernohorsky, 1980

= Peculator baccatus =

Species of gastropod

Peculator baccatus is a species of sea snail, a marine gastropod mollusk in the family Volutomitridae.
