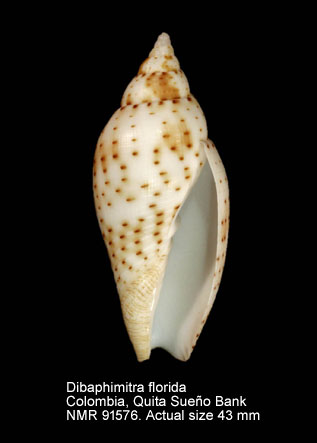

Scientific classification
- Kingdom: Animalia
- Phylum: Mollusca
- Class: Gastropoda
- Subclass: Caenogastropoda
- Order: Neogastropoda
- Family: Mitridae
- Genus: Dibaphimitra
- Species: D. florida

Binomial name
- Dibaphimitra florida (Gould, 1856)

Synonyms
- Dibaphimitra janetae Petuch, 1987; Mitra (Dibaphimitra) florida Gould, 1856; Mitra florida Gould, 1856 (original combination)

= Dibaphimitra florida =

Species of gastropod

Dibaphimitra florida is a species of sea snail, a marine gastropod mollusk in the family Mitridae, the miters or miter snails.

== Distribution ==
Western Atlantic Ocean: off Belize.
