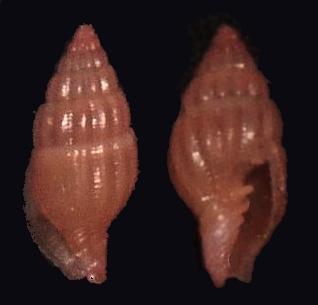
- Vexillum (Pusia) salisburyi

Scientific classification
- Kingdom: Animalia
- Phylum: Mollusca
- Class: Gastropoda
- Subclass: Caenogastropoda
- Order: Neogastropoda
- Superfamily: Turbinelloidea
- Family: Costellariidae
- Genus: Vexillum
- Species: V. salisburyi

Binomial name
- Vexillum salisburyi Cernohorsky, 1976

Synonyms
- Pusia salisburyi W.O. Cernohorsky, 1976; Vexillum (Costellaria) daniellae Drivas, J. & M. Jay, 1989; Vexillum (Pusia) salisburyi Cernohorsky, 1976

= Vexillum salisburyi =

Species of gastropod

Vexillum salisburyi is a species of small sea snail, marine gastropod mollusk in the family Costellariidae, the ribbed miters.

== Description ==
The shell size varies between 8 mm and 15 mm.

== Distribution ==
This species occurs in the Indian Ocean off Réunion and the Mascarene Basin; and in the Western Pacific Ocean off the Philippines and Hawaii; also off Australia (Queensland).

== Bibliography ==
- Cernohorsky, W.O. (1976). "The Taxonomy of Some Indo-Pacific Mollusca: Part 4. With descriptions of new taxa and remarks on Nassarius coppingeri (Smith)". Records of the Auckland Institute and Museum. 13: 111–129. ISSN 0067-0464. JSTOR 42906239. Wikidata Q58677032.
- Cernohorsky, W.O. 1978. Tropical Pacific marine shells. Sydney : Pacific Publications 352 pp., 68 pls.
- Drivas, J. & M. Jay (1988). Coquillages de La Réunion et de l'île Maurice
- Turner H. 2001. Katalog der Familie Costellariidae Macdonald, 1860. Conchbooks. 1–100-page(s): 57
- Robin, A. & Martin, J-C. 2004. Mitridae Costellariidae. Paris : Xenophora 34 pp., 32 plates.
