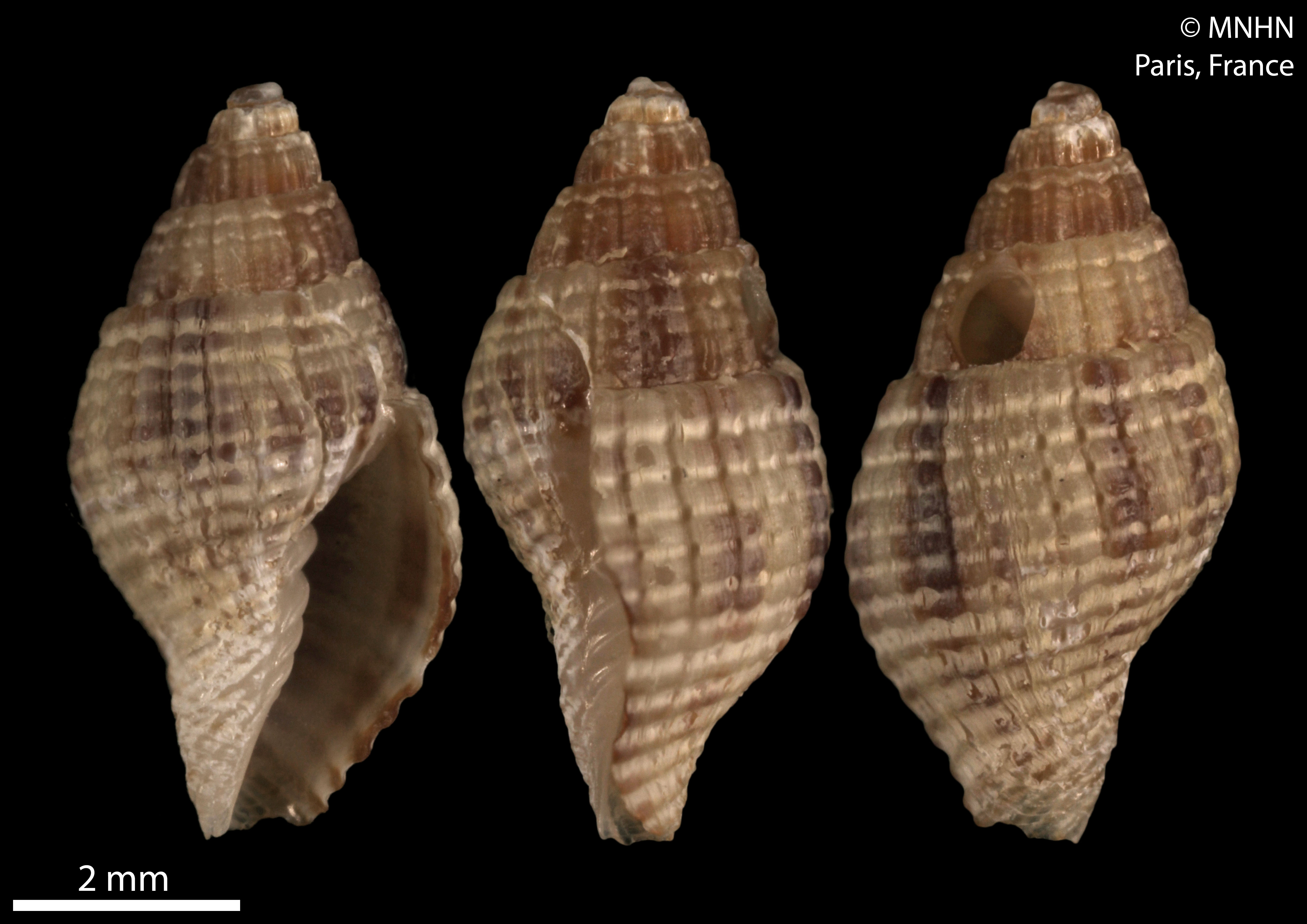
- Shell of Costapex joliveti (specimen at MNHN, Paris)

Scientific classification
- Kingdom: Animalia
- Phylum: Mollusca
- Class: Gastropoda
- Subclass: Caenogastropoda
- Order: Neogastropoda
- Superfamily: Turbinelloidea
- Family: Costellariidae
- Genus: Costapex
- Species: C. joliveti

Binomial name
- Costapex joliveti (Poppe & Tagaro, 2006)

Synonyms
- Vexillum (Pusia) joliveti Poppe & Tagaro, 2006; Vexillum joliveti Poppe & Tagaro, 2006

= Costapex joliveti =

Species of gastropod

Costapex joliveti is a species of sea snail, a marine gastropod mollusk, in the family Costellariidae, the ribbed miters.

== Description ==
Vexillum joliveti is a small, underwater sea snail, with a shell size of between 14 and 18 mm.

== Distribution ==
This species occurs in the following locations:

- Bismarck Sea
- Papua New Guinea
- Philippines
- East China Sea
