= Terebra connelli =

Scientific classification
- Kingdom: Animalia
- Phylum: Mollusca
- Class: Gastropoda
- Subclass: Caenogastropoda
- Order: Neogastropoda
- Family: Terebridae
- Genus: Terebra
- Species: T. connelli

Binomial name
- Terebra connelli Bratcher & Cernohorsky, 1985

Synonyms
- Cinguloterebra connelli (Bratcher & Cernohorsky, 1985)

Species of gastropod

Terebra connelli is a species of sea snail, a marine gastropod mollusc in the family Terebridae, the auger snails. The color on their bodies goes from a Brown to a lighter brown towards the tip.
