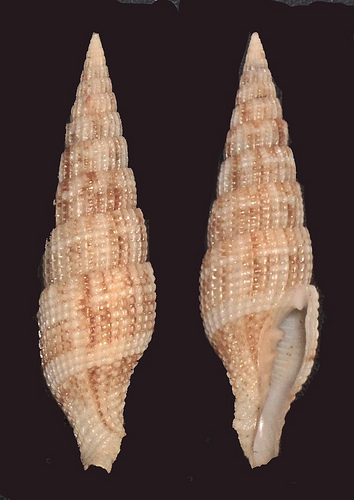
- Vexillum takakuwai

Scientific classification
- Kingdom: Animalia
- Phylum: Mollusca
- Class: Gastropoda
- Subclass: Caenogastropoda
- Order: Neogastropoda
- Superfamily: Turbinelloidea
- Family: Costellariidae
- Genus: Vexillum
- Species: V. takakuwai

Binomial name
- Vexillum takakuwai Cernohorsky & Azuma, 1974

Synonyms
- Vexillum (Costellaria) takakuwai Cernohorsky & M. Azuma, 1974

= Vexillum takakuwai =

Species of gastropod

Vexillum (Costellaria) takakuwai is a species of small sea snail, marine gastropod mollusk in the family Costellariidae, the ribbed miters.

== Description ==
The shell size varies between 27 mm and 70 mm.

== Distribution ==
This species occurs in the Pacific Ocean off in the East China Sea, off Japan, the Philippines and Queensland, Australia.
