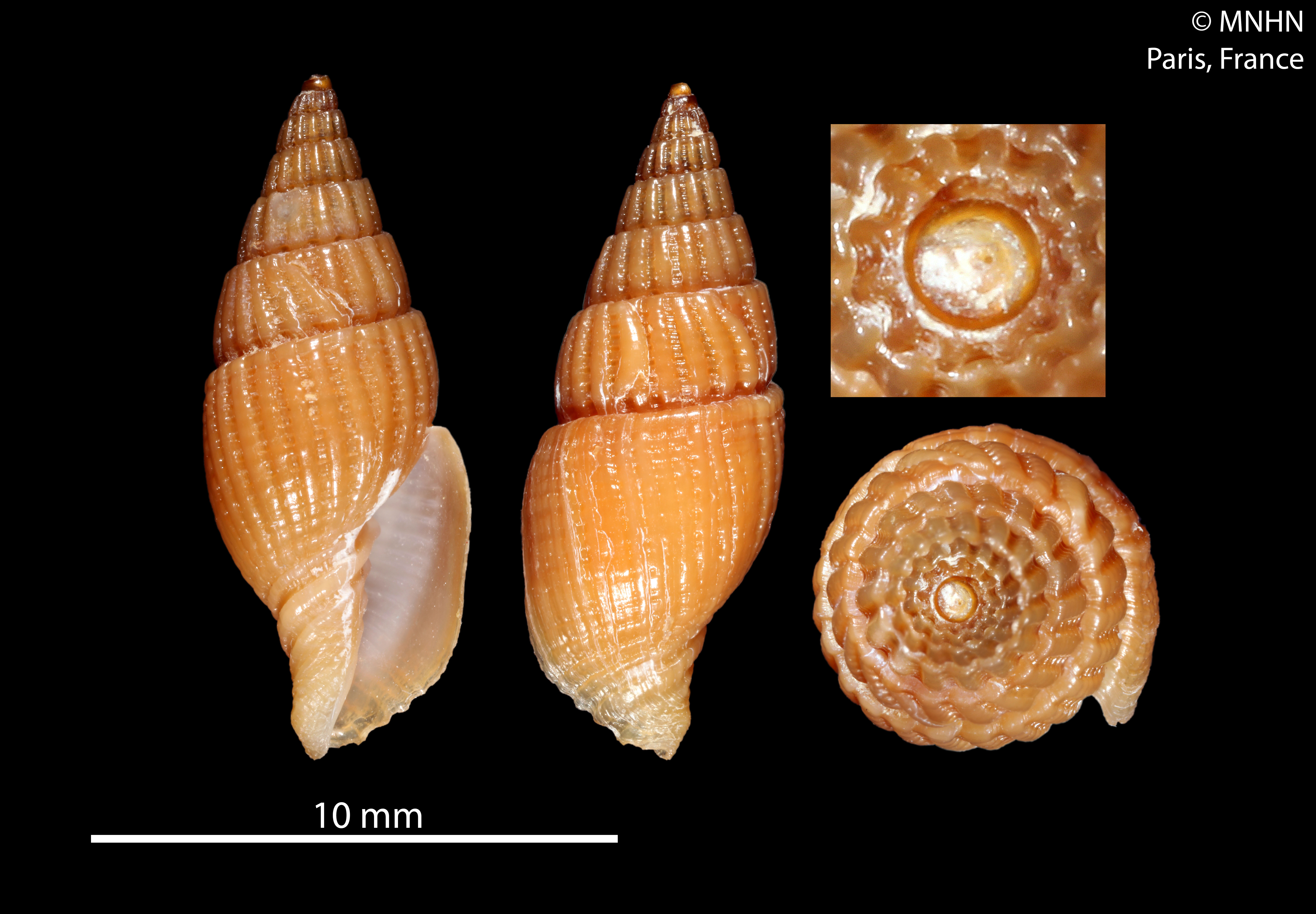
- Shell of Costapex ronnyi (paratype at MNHN, Paris)

Scientific classification
- Kingdom: Animalia
- Phylum: Mollusca
- Class: Gastropoda
- Subclass: Caenogastropoda
- Order: Neogastropoda
- Family: Costellariidae
- Genus: Costapex
- Species: C. ronnyi

Binomial name
- Costapex ronnyi (Poppe, Tagaro & Salisbury, 2009)

Synonyms
- Vexillum ronnyi Poppe, Tagaro & R. Salisbury, 2009 superseded combination

= Costapex ronnyi =

Species of gastropod

Costapex ronnyi is a species of small sea snail, marine gastropod mollusk in the family Costellariidae, the ribbed miters.

== Description ==
The length of the shell attains 14.1 mm.

== Distribution ==
This marine species occurs off the Philippines.
