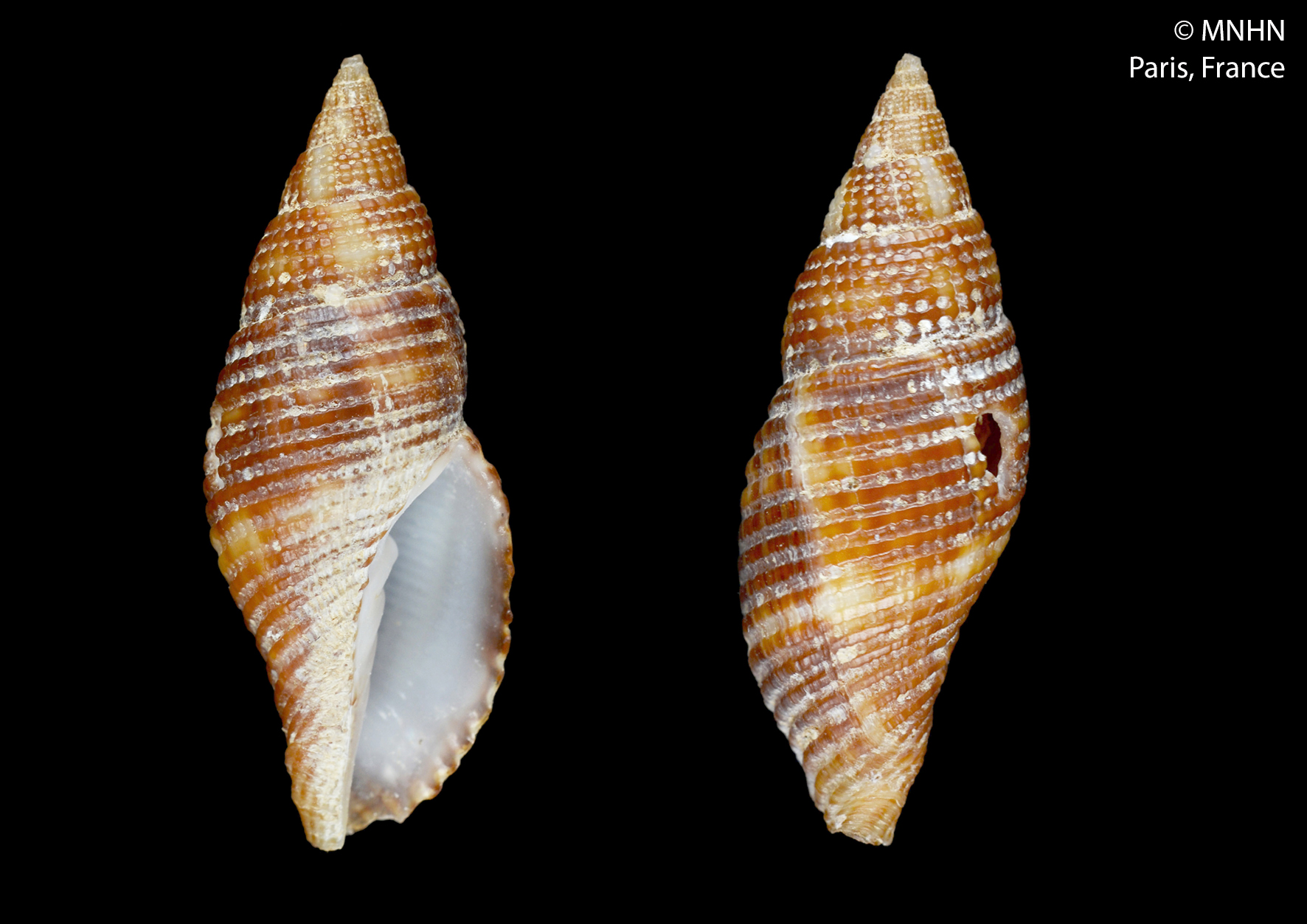
- Shell of Costapex exbodi (holotype at MNHN, Paris)

Scientific classification
- Kingdom: Animalia
- Phylum: Mollusca
- Class: Gastropoda
- Subclass: Caenogastropoda
- Order: Neogastropoda
- Superfamily: Turbinelloidea
- Family: Costellariidae
- Genus: Costapex
- Species: C. exbodi

Binomial name
- Costapex exbodi Fedosov, Herrmann & Bouchet, 2017

= Costapex exbodi =

Species of gastropod

Costapex exbodi is a species of sea snail, a marine gastropod mollusk, in the family Costellariidae, the ribbed miters.

== Description ==
The length of the shell attains 22.5 mm.

== Distribution ==
This marine species occurs in New Caledonia.
