= Lyria grangei =

Scientific classification
- Kingdom: Animalia
- Phylum: Mollusca
- Class: Gastropoda
- Subclass: Caenogastropoda
- Order: Neogastropoda
- Family: Volutidae
- Genus: Lyria
- Species: L. grangei

Binomial name
- Lyria grangei Cernohorsky, 1980

Species of gastropod

Lyria grangei is a species of sea snail, a marine gastropod mollusk in the family Volutidae, the volutes.

== Description ==
This operculated species attains a length of 71+ mm.

== Distribution ==
New Caledonia. Lyria grangei occurs in shallow waters of the Bellona Plateau of the Coral Sea. The type series was collected on a small submerged pinnacle in the southern sides of east South Bellona on sand at (Holotype, Paratype 1), in the peripheral reef slope of northwestern margins of western South Bellona at a depth of 17 meters (Paratype 2), and from the south side of the lagoon in western South Bellona (Paratype 3).
