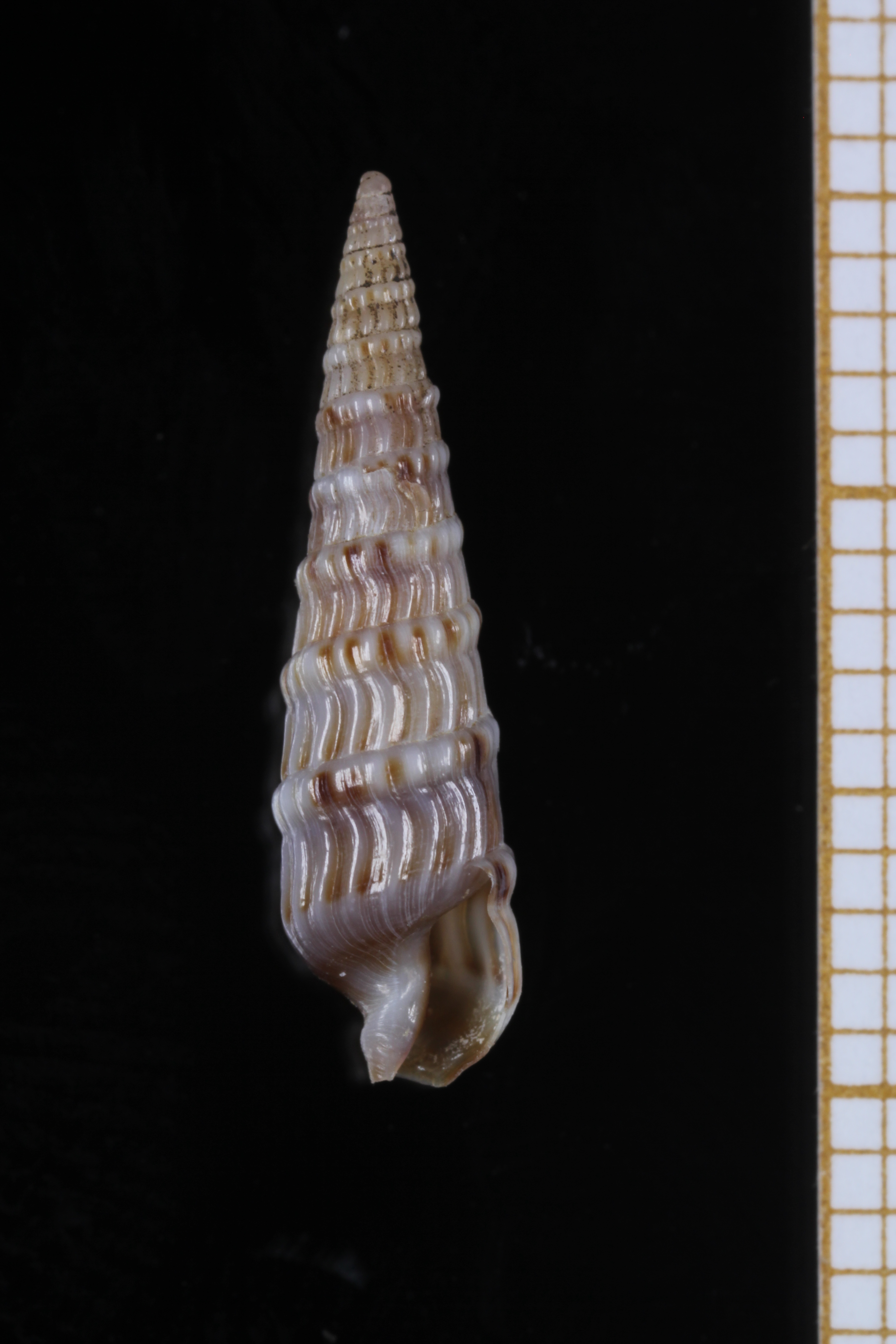
- Shell of Maculauger castigata (specimen at MNHN, Paris)

Scientific classification
- Kingdom: Animalia
- Phylum: Mollusca
- Class: Gastropoda
- Subclass: Caenogastropoda
- Order: Neogastropoda
- Superfamily: Conoidea
- Family: Terebridae
- Genus: Maculauger
- Species: M. castigatus

Binomial name
- Maculauger castigatus (A.H. Cooke, 1885)

Synonyms
- Granuliterebra castigata (A. H. Cooke, 1885); Hastulopsis castigata (A. H. Cooke, 1885); Terebra castigata A.H. Cooke, 1885

= Maculauger castigatus =

Species of gastropod

Maculauger castigatus is a species of sea snail, a marine gastropod mollusk in the family Terebridae, the auger snails.

== Description ==
The length of the shell varies between 10 mm and 20 mm. and the organism is benthic and has been documented in sand during low tide.

The species was originally described by A.H. Cooke in 1885 and was formerly classified under the genus Terebra.

== Distribution ==
This marine species occurs in the Gulf of Suez.
