= Austromitra minutenodosa =

Scientific classification
- Kingdom: Animalia
- Phylum: Mollusca
- Class: Gastropoda
- Subclass: Caenogastropoda
- Order: Neogastropoda
- Family: Costellariidae
- Genus: Austromitra
- Species: A. minutenodosa

Binomial name
- Austromitra minutenodosa (Cernohorsky, 1980)

Species of gastropod

Austromitra minutenodosa is a species of small sea snail, marine gastropod mollusk in the family Costellariidae, the ribbed miters. It is found in the waters of the Great Australian Bight.

== Taxonomy ==
The species was identified by Walter Oliver Cernohorsky in 1979.

== Description ==
Cernohorsky described Austromitra minutenodosa as follows:

Shell minute, up to 4.5 mm in length, elongate-ovate, teleoconch of 4 ½ whorls which are sub-angulate at sutures, protoconch (missing in adult specimens) of 1 ¼ smooth embryonic whorls in juvenile individuals. Whorls sculptured with moderately large, round nodules which are connected to each other by axial ribs which are prominent on early whorls but become less thick and concave between nodules on body whorl; penultimate whorl with 3 spiral rows of nodules, anterior row of nodules pressed against and partly covered by suture, body whorl with 4 rows of nodules. Axial ribs number from 13-14 on the penultimate and the body whorl and extremely fine, macroscopic longitudinal striae are visible in some individuals, spiral sculpture absent. Aperture about equal in height to the spire, smooth within, columella not calloused and with 3 strong, oblique folds, first two posterior folds become thick and rope-like and extend onto the siphonal fasciole towards the dorsal side. All specimens white to creamy-white in colour.

Cernohorsky noted that there were no visually similar species found in either Australia or New Zealand.

== Distribution ==
The type locality of the species is the Great Australian Bight. The species is primarily found in the bight, as far east as the western waters of the Eyre Peninsula, and as far north as the Mid West region of Western Australia.
