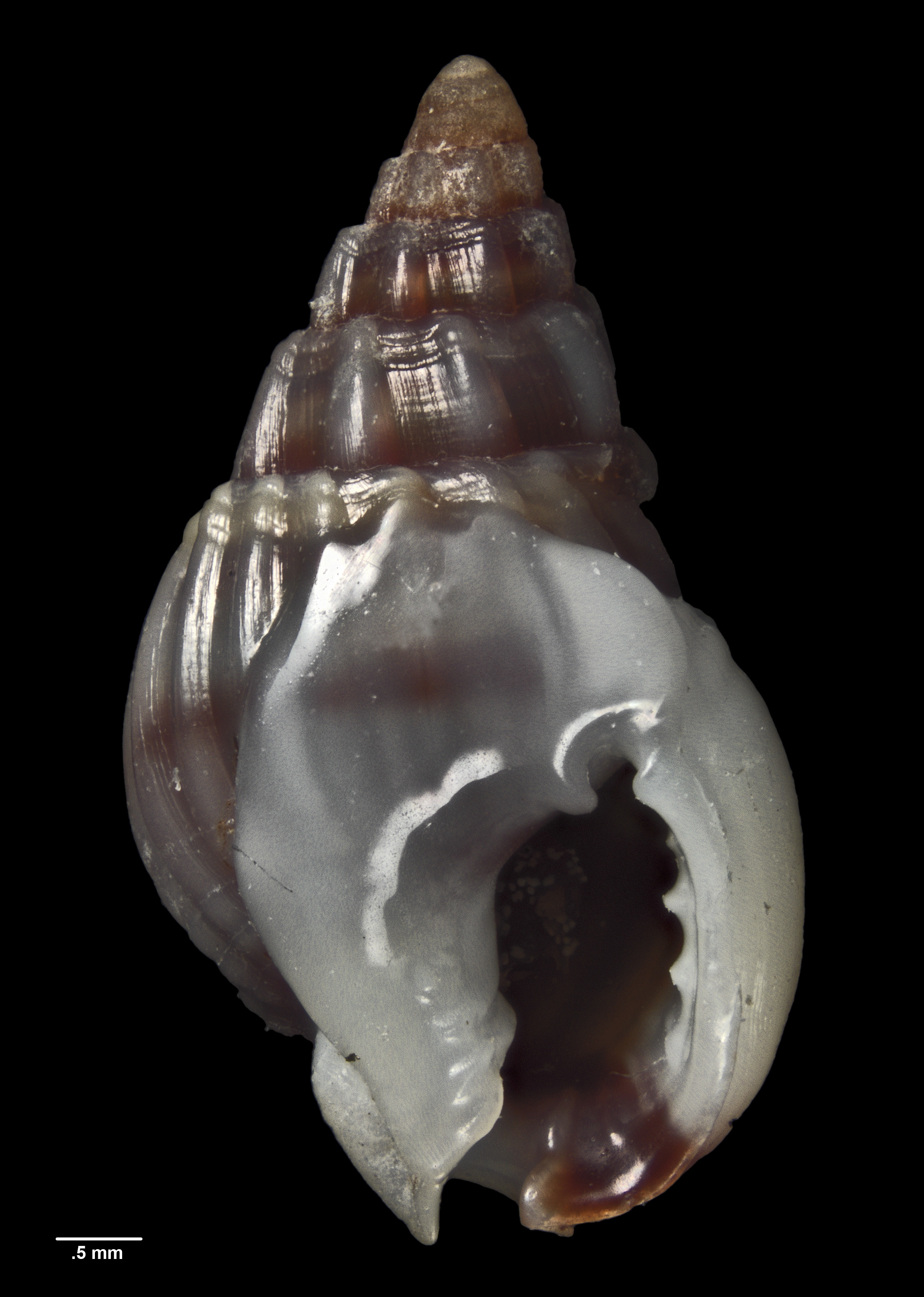
- Holotype of N. maccauslandi

Scientific classification
- Kingdom: Animalia
- Phylum: Mollusca
- Class: Gastropoda
- Subclass: Caenogastropoda
- Order: Neogastropoda
- Family: Nassariidae
- Genus: Nassarius
- Species: N. maccauslandi

Binomial name
- Nassarius maccauslandi Cernohorsky, 1984

Synonyms
- Nassarius (Plicarcularia) maccauslandi Cernohorsky, 1984

= Nassarius maccauslandi =

Species of marine mollusc

Nassarius maccauslandi is a species of dog whelk, a marine mollusc, in the family Nassariidae. The species is found in tropical waters of the Pacific Ocean, including Fiji, the Philippines and Indonesia.

== Description ==
Nassarius maccauslandi has a shell up to 7 mm (0.28 in) in length. The shells are elongate-ovate, solid with a teleoconch of between 4 and 4.5 convex whorls, and a protoconch with glassy, finely carinate embryonic whorls numbering 3.75 to 4. The shells are grey with a golden sheen, and has spire whirls ornamented with two brown to purple-brown spirals. It can be distinguished from N. fraudulentus by having more embryonic whorls (compared to 2.25–2.75 in N. fraudulentus), two prominent sutural cords.

== Taxonomy ==
The species was first described in 1984 by Walter Oliver Cernohorsky, who used the name Nassarius (Plicarcularia) maccauslandi, placing the species in a subgenus named Plicarcularia, which is no longer accepted. The holotype, collected from Lami, Fiji in September 1978, is kept at the Auckland War Memorial Museum in New Zealand. The species was named after O. K. McCausland, who discovered the holotype.

== Distribution and habitat ==
The species is known from shallow water in islands of the Pacific Ocean and South East Asia, including Fiji, the Philippines, Indonesia (Ambon Island, Western New Guinea and Bali) and in Papua New Guinea.

== Gallery ==
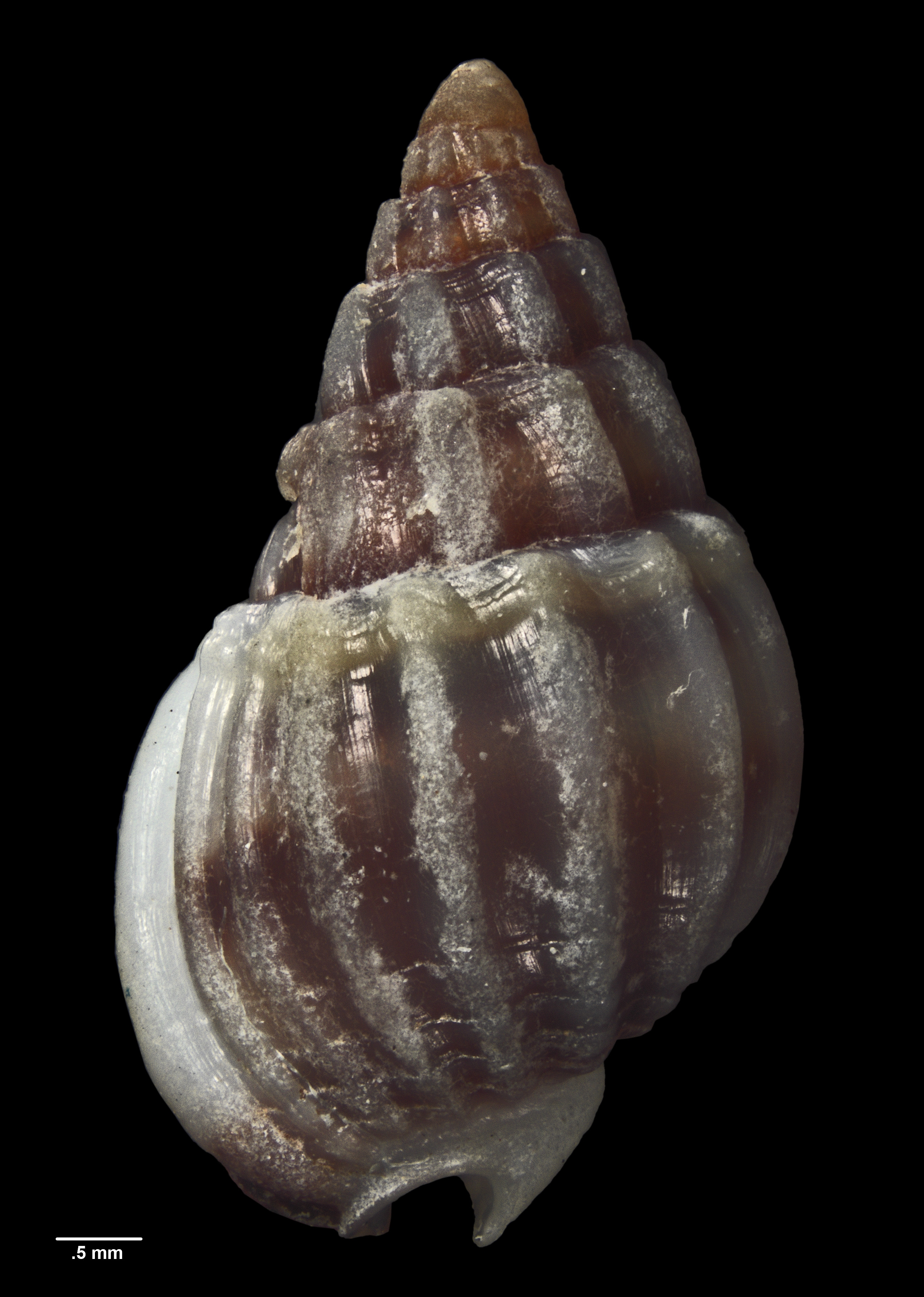
Reverse view of holotype

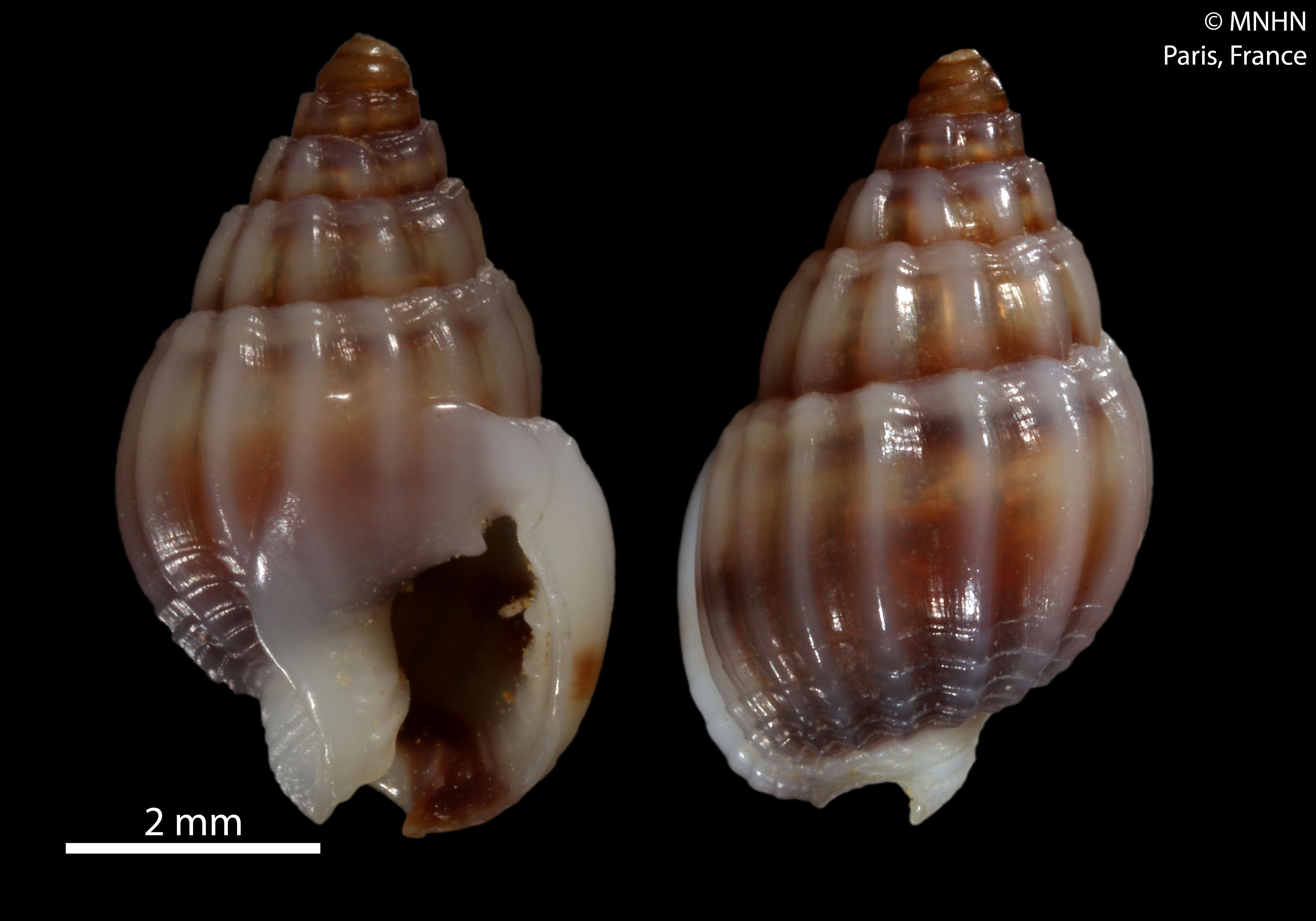
Paratype from the National Museum of Natural History, France
