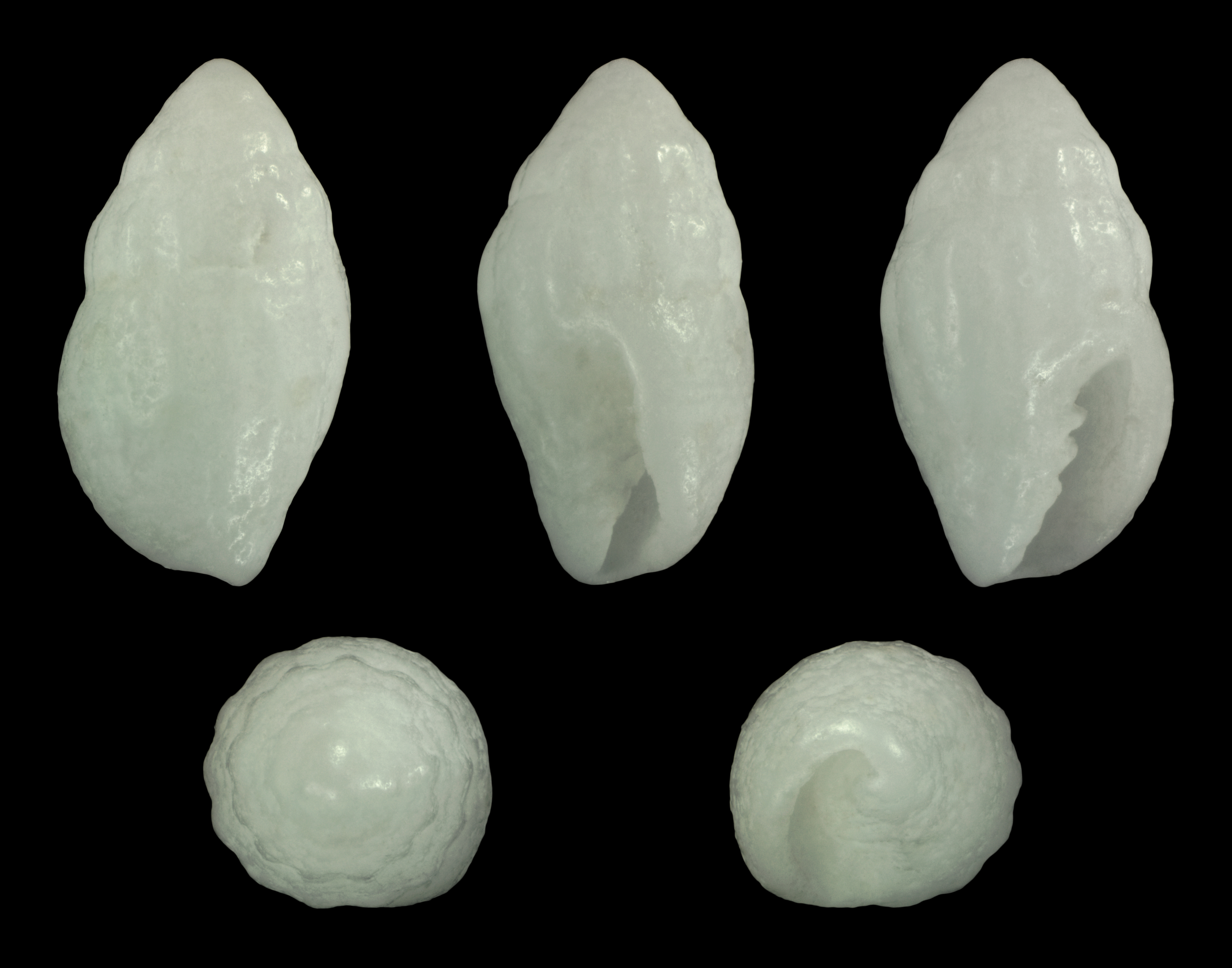

Scientific classification
- Kingdom: Animalia
- Phylum: Mollusca
- Class: Gastropoda
- Subclass: Caenogastropoda
- Order: Neogastropoda
- Superfamily: Turbinelloidea
- Family: Costellariidae
- Genus: Vexillum
- Species: V. malleopunctum

Binomial name
- Vexillum malleopunctum (Cernohorsky, 1981)

Synonyms
- Vexillum (Costellaria) malleopunctum Cernohorsky, 1981 · unaccepted (basionym); Vexillum (Pusia) malleopunctum Cernohorsky, 1981

= Vexillum malleopunctum =

Species of gastropod

Vexillum malleopunctum is a species of small sea snail, marine gastropod mollusk in the family Costellariidae, the ribbed miters.

== Distribution ==
This marine species occurs off Western Australia.
