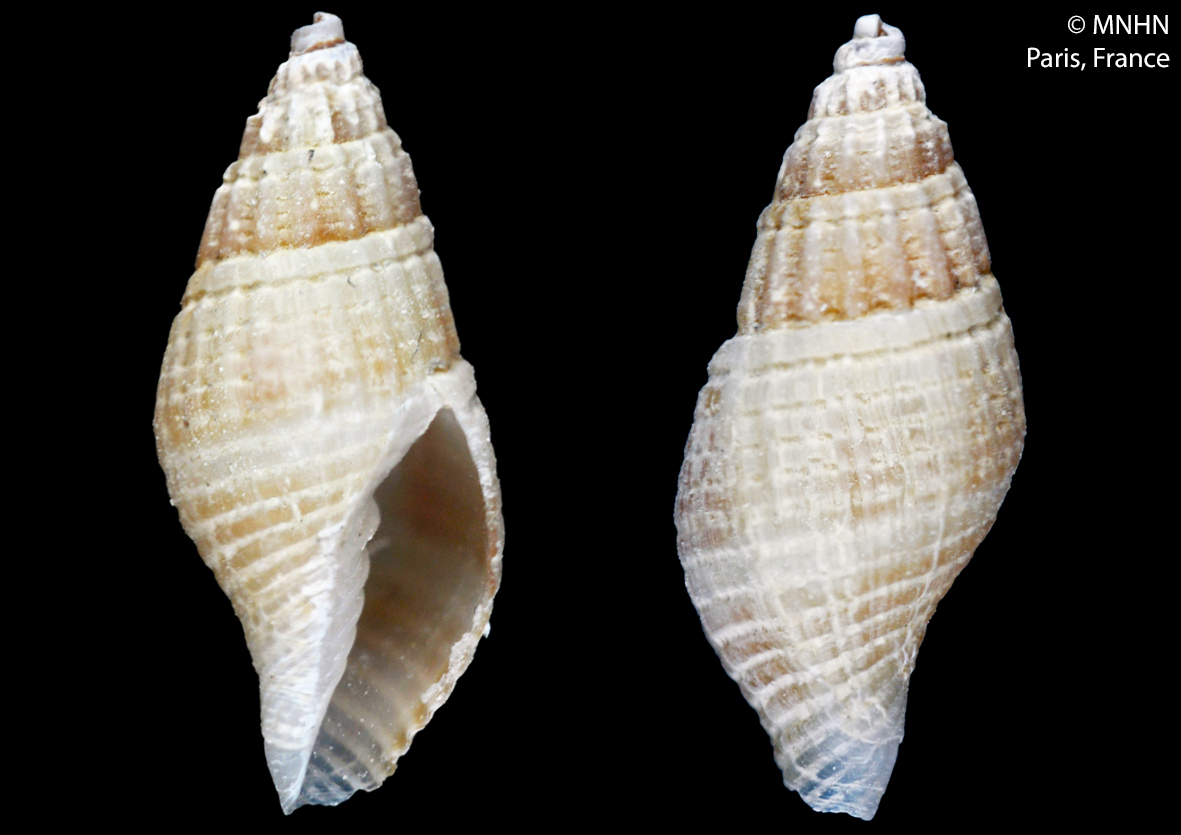
- Shell of Costapex sulcatus (holotype at MNHN, Paris)

Scientific classification
- Kingdom: Animalia
- Phylum: Mollusca
- Class: Gastropoda
- Subclass: Caenogastropoda
- Order: Neogastropoda
- Superfamily: Turbinelloidea
- Family: Costellariidae
- Genus: Costapex
- Species: C. sulcatus

Binomial name
- Costapex sulcatus Fedosov, Herrmann & Bouchet, 2017

= Costapex sulcatus =

Species of gastropod

Costapex sulcatus is a species of sea snail, a marine gastropod mollusk, in the family Costellariidae, the ribbed miters.

== Distribution ==
This species occurs in the following locations:

- Philippines
- Solomon Islands
- Vanuatu (Nation)
