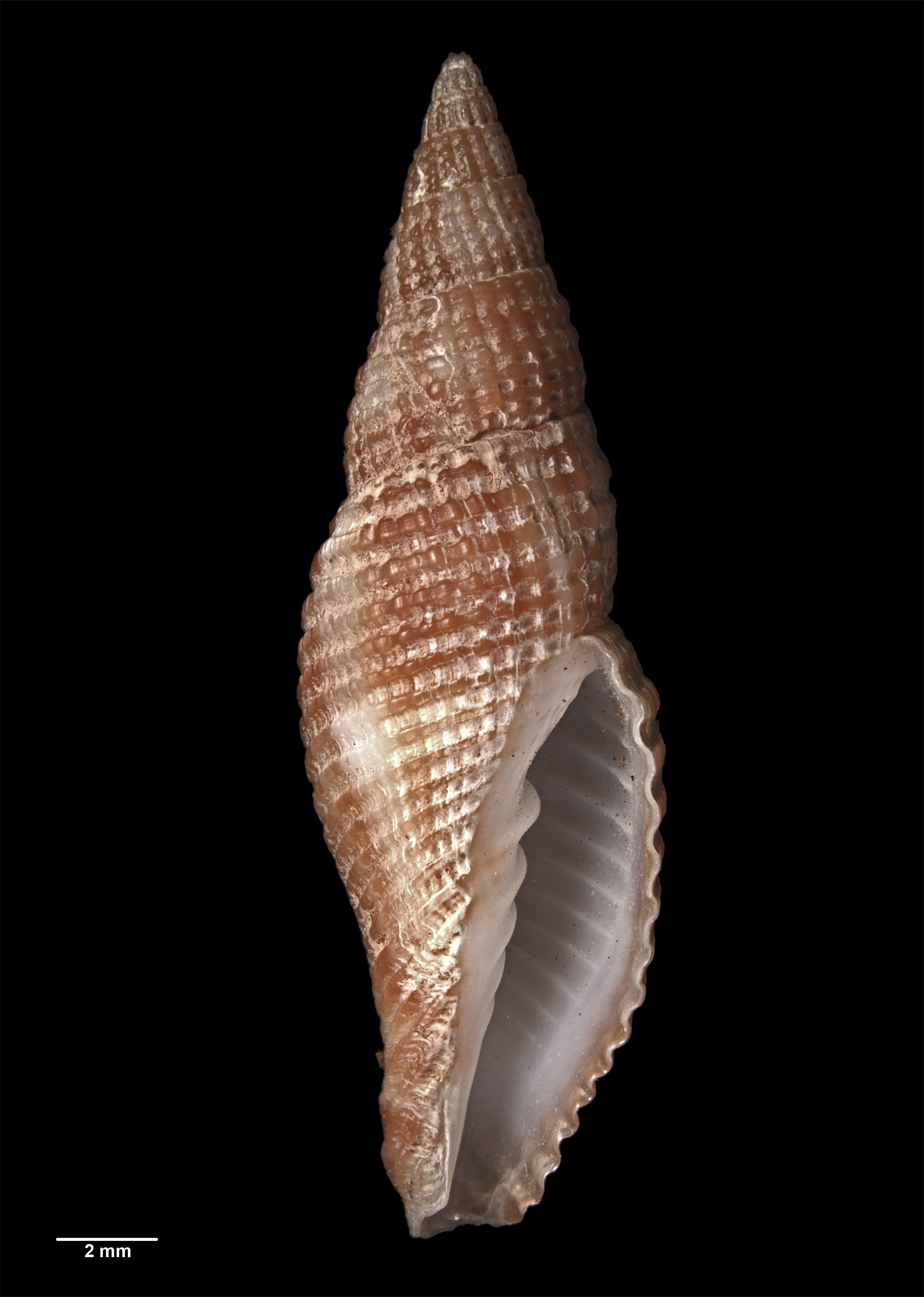
- Holotype

Scientific classification
- Kingdom: Animalia
- Phylum: Mollusca
- Class: Gastropoda
- Subclass: Caenogastropoda
- Order: Neogastropoda
- Superfamily: Turbinelloidea
- Family: Costellariidae
- Genus: Costapex
- Species: C. martinorum

Binomial name
- Costapex martinorum (Cernohorsky, 1986)

Synonyms
- Vexillum (Costellaria) martinorum Cernohorsky, 1986; Vexillum martinorum Cernohorsky, 1986

= Costapex martinorum =

Species of gastropod

Costapex martinorum is a species of sea snail, a marine gastropod mollusk, in the family Costellariidae, the ribbed miters. The species was identified by Walter Oliver Cernohorsky in 1986, based on a specimen in the Auckland War Memorial Museum collected from off the coast of Cuaming Island in the Philippines.
