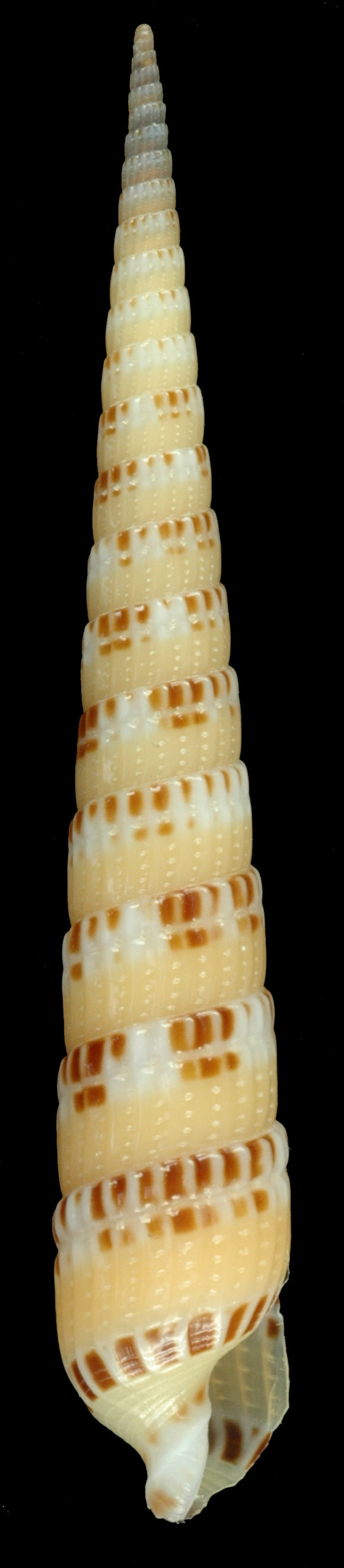
- Shell of Maculauger kokiy (specimen at MNHN, Paris)

Scientific classification
- Kingdom: Animalia
- Phylum: Mollusca
- Class: Gastropoda
- Subclass: Caenogastropoda
- Order: Neogastropoda
- Family: Terebridae
- Genus: Maculauger
- Species: M. kokiy

Binomial name
- Maculauger kokiy Pacaud & Lesport, 2020

Synonyms
- Hastulopsis pseudopertusa (Bratcher & Cernohorsky, 1985); Maculauger pseudopertusus (Bratcher & Cernohorsky, 1985); Terebra pseudopertusa Bratcher & Cernohorsky, 1985 (original combination)

= Maculauger kokiy =

Species of gastropod

Maculauger kokiy is a species of sea snail, a marine gastropod mollusk in the family Terebridae, the auger snails.

== Description ==
The length of the shell attains 36 mm.

== Distribution ==
This species occurs in the Indian Ocean off Réunion and Papua New Guinea.
