= Barbara Mearns =

Scottish naturalist

Barbara Crawford Mearns (born 12 May 1955 in Greenock, Renfrewshire) is a Scottish naturalist, known as a co-author, with her husband, of biographies of ornithologists. She is particularly interested in bird watching and environmental preservation.

== Early life and education ==
Mearns is the daughter of George and Jean Crawford, née Kinloch. George Crawford was a teacher. In 1973 Barbara Crawford began studying occupational therapy in Dumfries at the Astley Ainslie College of Occupational Therapy. There she graduated with a diploma from the British Association of Occupational Therapists in 1975. From 1976 to 1980 she worked in the children's psychiatric ward at Crichton Royal Hospital in Dumfries. From 1980 to 1981 she studied at the Bible Training Institute of Glasgow.

== Career ==
In April 1981 she married Richard Mearns (b. 1950), a countryside ranger and research ornithologist (now retired). Since 1985 she has been a member of the A Rocha Trust, an international Christian environmental organization that maintains study centers in Canada, Kenya, Portugal, France and the Czech Republic, among other locations. This association's initiatives include the protection of the Aammiq swamps in Lebanon, project assistance to generate sustainable income in impoverished communities and the protection of the dry savannah in Ghana. From 1997 to 2002, Mearns coordinated the UK office and communications work of this organization, and she was an administrator at A Rocha International from 2002 to 2017, when she retired. Since 1988, together with her husband, she has published biographers on ornithologists, including Biographies for Birdwatchers: The Lives of Those Commemorated in Western Palearctic Bird Names (1988), Audubon to Xántus: The Lives of Those Commemorated in North American Bird Names (illustrated by Dana Gardner, 1992), The Bird Collectors (1998), and John Kirk Townsend: Collector of Audubon's Western Birds and Mammals (2007). In 2012 she published the volume of poetry Bairns and Beasts together with Leonie Ewing. In 2022, a revised edition of Biographies for Birdwatchers: The Lives of Those Commemorated in Western Palearctic Bird Names was published in two volumes.

Barbara Mearns has participated in many British Trust for Ornithology (BTO) surveys. She and her husband scientifically record butterflies and moths. During the winter season, she often gives talks to groups such as the Scottish Wildlife Trust. She has contributed scientific papers and brief notes to journals, such as Scottish Birds, book reviews to The Times Literary Supplement (TLS) and Ibis, and articles for popular magazines, such as Bird Watcher's Digest.

== Selected works ==
- Mearns, Barbara; Mearns, Richard (1988). Biographies for Birdwatchers: The Lives of Those Commemorated in Western Palearctic Bird Names. Academic Press. ISBN 9780124874220; 490 pages
- Mearns, Barbara; Mearns, Richard (1992). Audubon to Xantus: The Lives of Those Commemorated in North American Bird Names. Academic Press. ASIN B00572JM8M. ISBN 9780124874237; hbk, 588 pages
- Mearns, Barbara; Mearns, Richard (1998). The Bird Collectors. Academic Press. ISBN 9780124874404; 472 pages
- Mearns, Barbara; Mearns, Richard (2007). John Kirk Townsend: Collector of Audubon's Western Birds and Mammals. ISBN 9780955673900; hbk, 400 pages (See John Kirk Townsend.)
