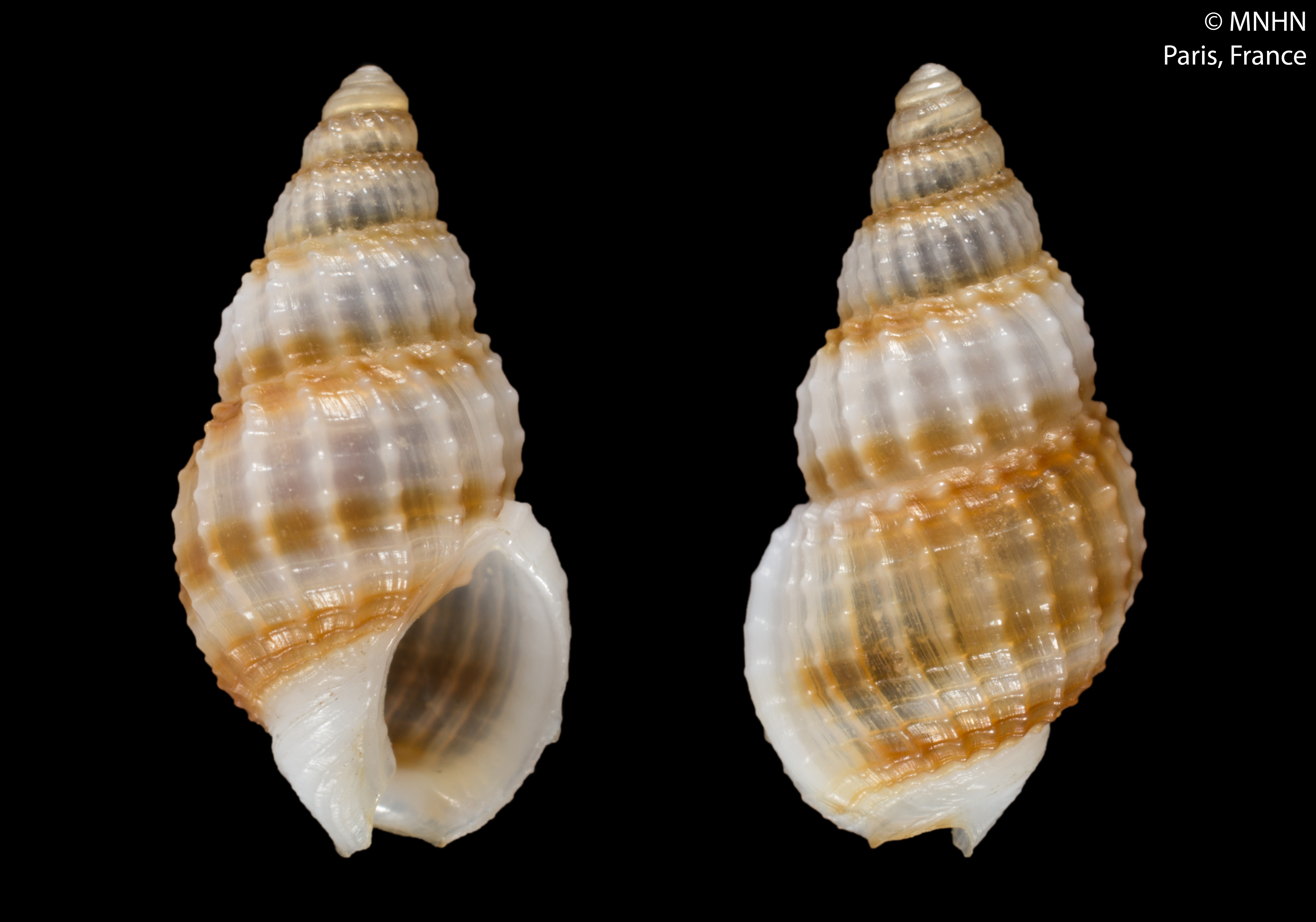
- Shell of Nassarius cernohorskyi (holotype at MNHN, Paris)

Scientific classification
- Kingdom: Animalia
- Phylum: Mollusca
- Class: Gastropoda
- Subclass: Caenogastropoda
- Order: Neogastropoda
- Family: Nassariidae
- Genus: Nassarius
- Species: N. cernohorskyi

Binomial name
- Nassarius cernohorskyi Kool, 2005

= Nassarius cernohorskyi =

Species of gastropod

Nassarius cernohorskyi is a species of sea snail, a marine gastropod mollusk in the family Nassariidae, the Nassa mud snails or dog whelks.

== Description ==
The length of the shell attains 8.7 mm.

== Distribution ==
This species occurs in the Pacific Ocean off the Marquesas Islands.
