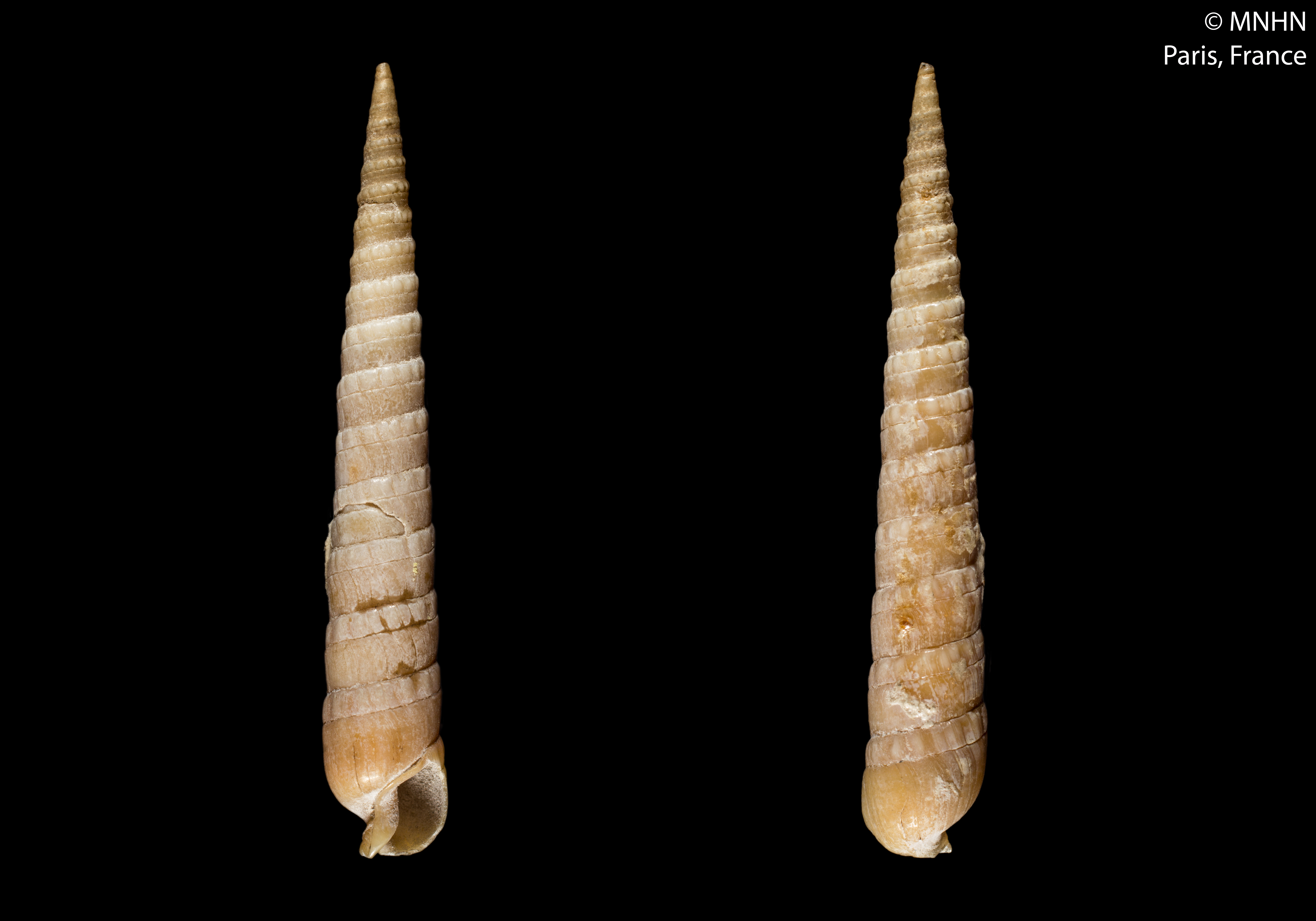
- Shell of Terebra quoygaimardi (holotype at MNHN, Paris)

Scientific classification
- Kingdom: Animalia
- Phylum: Mollusca
- Class: Gastropoda
- Subclass: Caenogastropoda
- Order: Neogastropoda
- Family: Terebridae
- Genus: Terebra
- Species: T. quoygaimardi

Binomial name
- Terebra quoygaimardi Cernohorsky & Bratcher, 1976

Synonyms
- Cinguloterebra monilis (Quoy & Gaimard, 1976); Dimidacus monilis (Quoy & Gaimard, 1976); Terebra monile Quoy & Gaimard, 1833; Terebra monilis (Quoy & Gaimard, 1876)

= Terebra quoygaimardi =

Species of gastropod

Terebra quoygaimardi is a species of sea snail, a marine gastropod mollusc in the family Terebridae, the auger snails.

== Description ==
The length of the shell varies between 28 mm and 65 mm.

== Distribution ==
This species occurs in the Indo-West Pacific.
