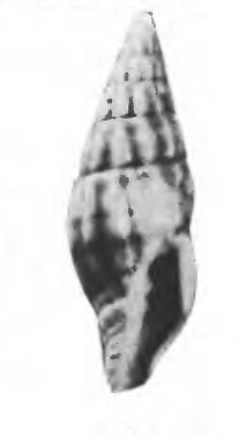
- Shell of Vexillum cernohorskyi (holotype)

Scientific classification
- Kingdom: Animalia
- Phylum: Mollusca
- Class: Gastropoda
- Subclass: Caenogastropoda
- Order: Neogastropoda
- Superfamily: Turbinelloidea
- Family: Costellariidae
- Genus: Vexillum
- Species: †V. cernohorskyi

Binomial name
- †Vexillum cernohorskyi Ladd, 1977

Synonyms
- † Vexillum (Costellaria) cernohorskyi Ladd, 1977

= Vexillum cernohorskyi =

Species of gastropod

Vexillum cernohorskyi is an extinct species of sea snail, a marine gastropod mollusk, in the family Costellariidae, the ribbed miters.

== Description ==
The length of the shell attains 8.2 mm, its diameter 2.7 mm.

(Original description) The small, slender shell has a fusiform shape. The protoconch consists of about two smooth, glassy whorls, followed by about seven sculptured whorls. The early whorls of the spire are nearly flat, the later whorls slightly more convex. The suture is lightly impressed. The sculpture consists of broad, rounded, slightly curved, axial ribs that are regularly spaced, 10 or 11 on the body whorl. Weak spiral striae are present in the depressions between axial ribs. The aperture is elongate and shorter than spire;.The columella has four inclined folds. Traces of four dark bands of color are discernible on the Body whorl, the highest one thinner than the other three.

== Distribution ==
Fossils of this marine species were found in late Miocene strata in the Eniwetok Atoll.
