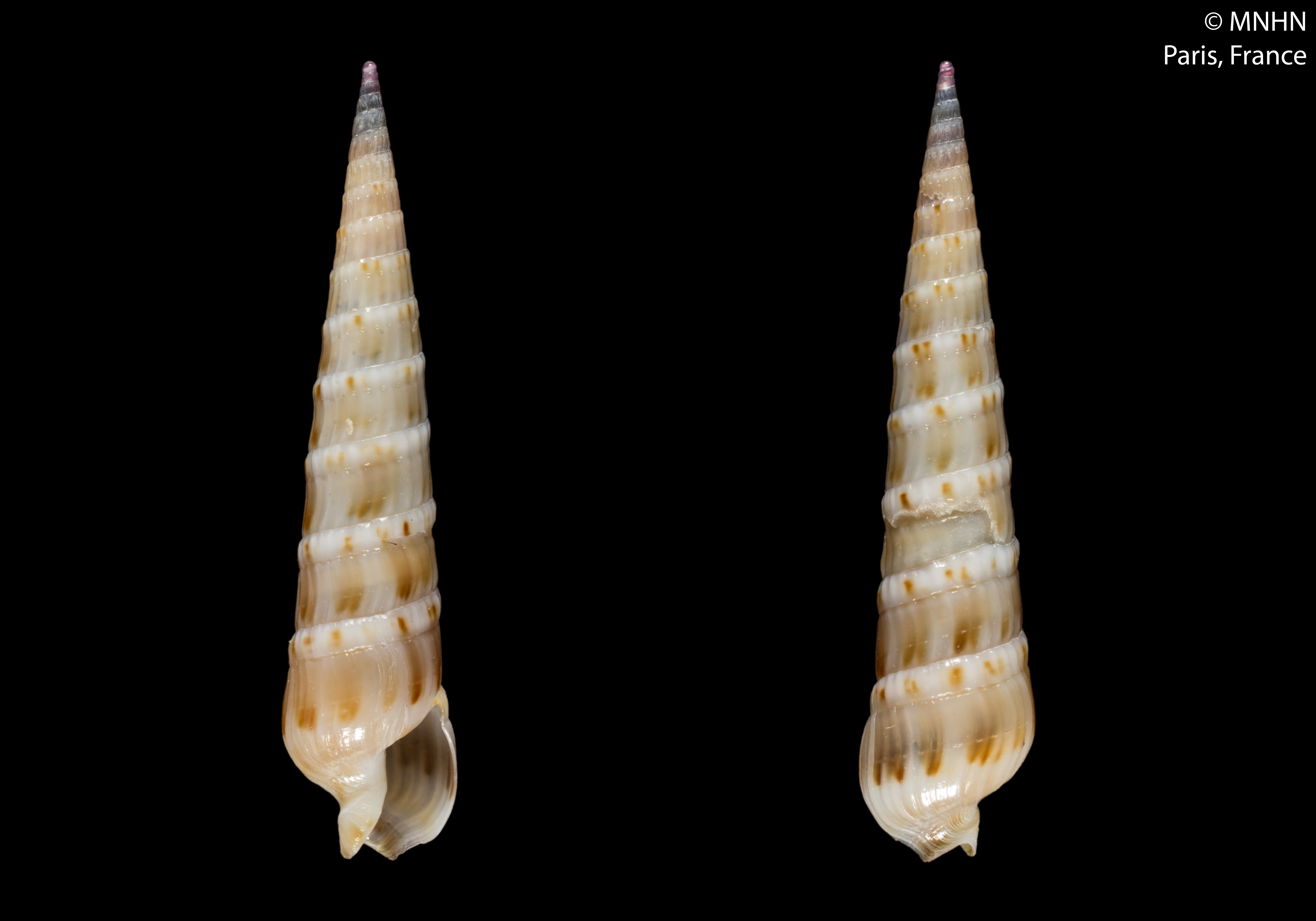
- Shell of Hastulopsis mirbatensis (holotype at MNHN, Paris)

Scientific classification
- Kingdom: Animalia
- Phylum: Mollusca
- Class: Gastropoda
- Subclass: Caenogastropoda
- Order: Neogastropoda
- Superfamily: Conoidea
- Family: Terebridae
- Genus: Hastulopsis; Oyama, 1961

Type species
- Terebra melanacme E.A. Smith, 1873

Species
- See text

= Hastulopsis =

Genus of gastropods

Hastulopsis is a genus of sea snails, marine gastropod molluscs in the family Terebridae, the auger snails.

== Species ==
Species within the genus Hastulopsis include:

- Hastulopsis baliensis Terryn & Dekker, 2017
- Hastulopsis blanda (Deshayes, 1859)
- Hastulopsis cebuensis Gargiulo, 2014
- Hastulopsis elialae (Aubry, 1994)
- Hastulopsis gotoensis (E.A. Smith, 1879)
- Hastulopsis loisae (E.A. Smith, 1903)
- Hastulopsis maestratii Terryn & Rosado, 2011
- Hastulopsis marmorata (Deshayes, 1859)
- Hastulopsis masirahensis Terryn & Rosado, 2016
- Hastulopsis melanacme (E.A. Smith, 1873)
- Hastulopsis mirbatensis Terryn & Rosado, 2016
- Hastulopsis suspensa (E.A. Smith, 1904)
- Hastulopsis whiteheadae (Aubry & Marquet, 1995)

Species brought into synonymy

- Hastulopsis alvelolata (Hinds, 1844): synonym of Maculauger alveolatus (Hinds, 1844)
- Hastulopsis alveolata (Hinds, 1844): synonym of Maculauger alveolatus (Hinds, 1844)
- Hastulopsis amoena (Deshayes, 1859): synonym of Myurella amoena (Deshayes, 1859)
- Hastulopsis bilineata (Aubry, 2004): synonym of Myurella bilineata (Sprague, 2004)
- Hastulopsis burchi (Bratcher & Cernohorsky, 1982): synonym of Myurella burchi (Bratcher & Cernohorsky, 1982)
- Hastulopsis campbelli (Burch, 1965): synonym of Maculauger campbelli (R. D. Burch, 1965)
- Hastulopsis castigata (A. H. Cooke, 1885): synonym of Maculauger castigatus (A. H. Cooke, 1885)
- Hastulopsis conspersa (Hinds, 1844): synonym of Myurella conspersa (Hinds, 1844)
- Hastulopsis gotoensis (E.A. Smith, 1961): synonym of Hastulopsis gotoensis (E.A. Smith, 1879)
- Hastulopsis hindsi (Deshayes, 1857): synonym of Hastulopsis conspersa (Hinds, 1844)
- Hastulopsis mindanaoensis Aubry, 2008: synonym of Myurella mindanaoensis (Aubry, 2008)
- Hastulopsis minipulchra (Bozzetti, 2008): synonym of Maculauger minipulcher (Bozzetti, 2008)
- Hastulopsis pertusa (Born, 1778): synonym of Myurella pertusa (Born, 1778)
- Hastulopsis pseudopertusa (Bratcher & Cernohorsky, 1985): synonym of Maculauger kokiy Pacaud & Lesport, 2020
- Hastulopsis turrita (E.A. Smith, 1873): synonym of Punctoterebra turrita (E. A. Smith, 1873)
