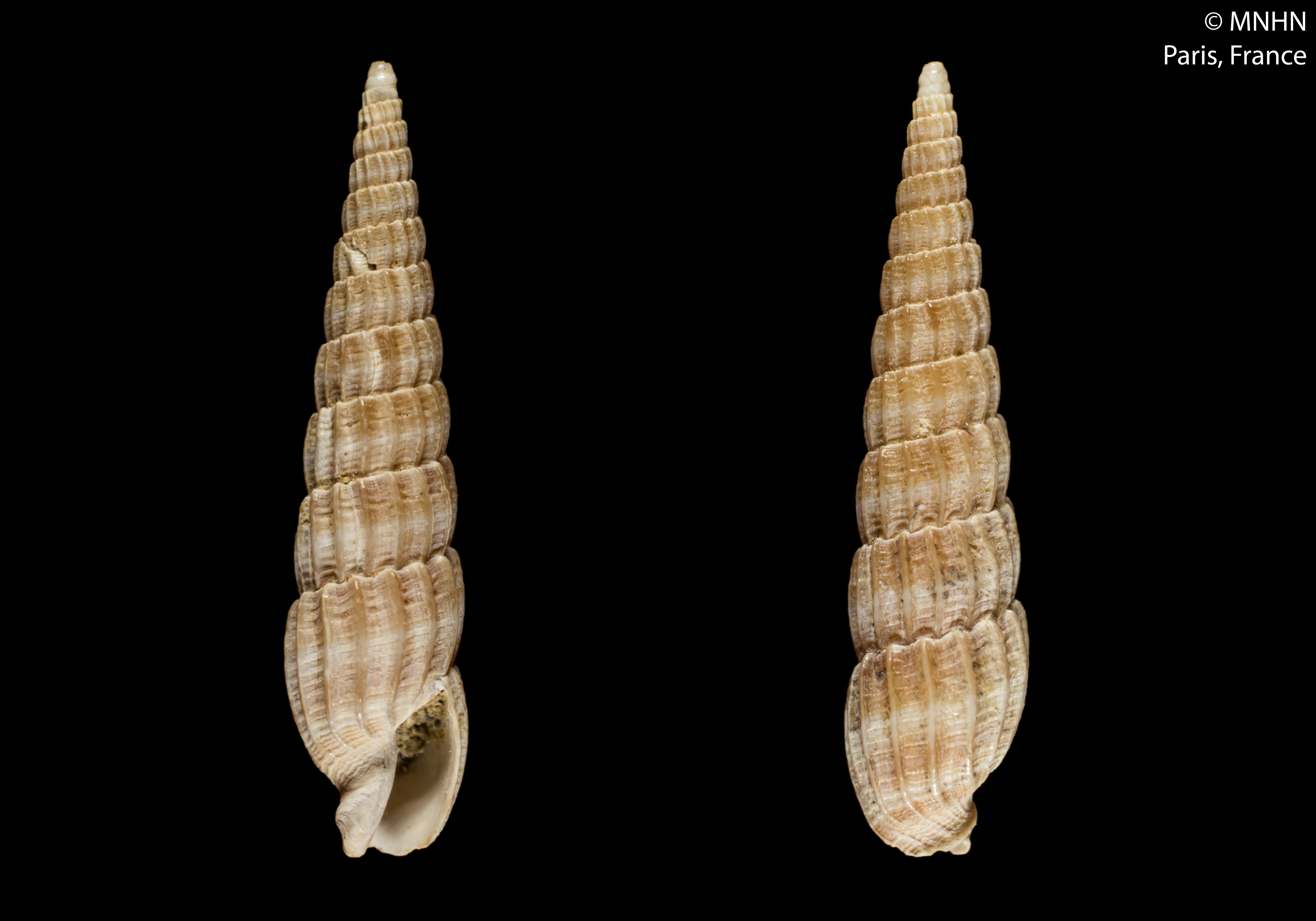
- Shell of Myurella brunneobandata (holotype at MNHN, Paris)

Scientific classification
- Kingdom: Animalia
- Phylum: Mollusca
- Class: Gastropoda
- Subclass: Caenogastropoda
- Order: Neogastropoda
- Superfamily: Conoidea
- Family: Terebridae
- Genus: Myurella; Hinds, 1844

Type species
- Terebra affinis Gray, 1834

Species
- See text

Synonyms
- Clathroterebra Oyama, 1961; Decorihastula Oyama, 1961; Terebra (Myurella) Hinds, 1844; Terenolla Iredale, 1929

= Myurella =

Genus of gastropods

Myurella is a genus of sea snails, marine gastropod molluscs in the subfamily Terebrinae of the family Terebridae, the auger snails.

== Species ==
Species within the genus Myurella include:

- Myurella affinis (Gray, 1834)
- Myurella amoena (Deshayes, 1859)
- Myurella andamanica (Melvill & Sykes, 1898)
- † Myurella basterotii (Nyst, 1845)
- Myurella bilineata (Sprague, 2004)
- Myurella brunneobandata (Malcolm & Terryn, 2012)
- Myurella burchi (Bratcher & Cernohorsky, 1982)
- Myurella conspersa (Hinds, 1844)
- Myurella dedonderi (Terryn, 2003)
- Myurella eburnea (Hinds, 1844)
- Myurella flavofasciata (Pilsbry, 1921)
- Myurella fortunei (Deshayes, 1857)
- Myurellopsis guphilae (Poppe, Tagaro & Terryn, 2009)
- Myurella joelbartschi (Poppe, Tagaro & Goto, 2018)
- Myurella mactanensis (Bratcher & Cernohorsky, 1982)
- Myurella mauricejayi Terryn, Gori & Rosado, 2019
- Myurella mindanaoensis (Aubry, 2008)
- Myurella multistriata (Schepman, 1913)
- Myurella nebulosa (G.B. Sowerby I, 1825)
- Myurella ningaloensis (Aubry, 1999)
- Myurella pertusa (Born, 1778)
- † Myurella peyrehoradensis (Peyrot, 1931)
- Myurella picardali (Aubry, 2011)
- Myurella pseudofortunei (Aubry, 2008)
- Myurella pygmaea (Hinds, 1844)
- Myurella reunionensis (Bratcher & Cernohorsky, 1985)
- Myurella russoi (Aubry, 1991)
- Myurella suduirauti (Terryn & Conde, 2004)
- Myurella wellsilviae (Aubry, 1994)

== Species brought into synonymy ==
- Myurella albocincta Carpenter, 1857: synonym of Terebra armillata Hinds, 1844
- Myurella belcheri E.A. Smith, 1873: synonym of Terebra guayaquilensis (E.A. Smith, 1880)
- Myurella capensis E.A. Smith, 1873: synonym of Euterebra capensis (E.A. Smith, 1873)
- Myurella cinctella (Deshayes, 1859): synonym of Maculauger cinctellus (Deshayes, 1859)
- Myurella columellaris (Hinds, 1844): synonym of Myurellopsis columellaris (Hinds, 1844)
- Myurella contracta E.A. Smith, 1873: synonym of Terebra contracta (E.A. Smith, 1873)
- Myurella duplicatoides Bartsch, 1923: synonym of Duplicaria duplicata (Linnaeus, 1758)
- Myurella exiguoides (Schepman, 1913): synonym of Punctoterebra exiguoides (Schepman, 1913)
- Myurella fijiensis E.A. Smith, 1873: synonym of Terebra fijiensis E.A. Smith, 1873
- Myurella granulosa E.A. Smith, 1873: synonym of Pristiterebra pustulosa (E.A. Smith, 1879)
- Myurella guayaquilensis E.A. Smith, 1880: synonym of Terebra guayaquilensis (E.A. Smith, 1880)
- Myurella hindsii Carpenter, 1857: synonym of Terebra intertincta Hinds, 1844
- Myurella hiscocki (Sprague, 2004): synonym of Profunditerebra hiscocki (Sprague, 2004)
- Myurella joserosadoi (Bozzetti 2001): synonym of Myurellopsis joserosadoi (Bozzetti, 2001)
- Myurella kilburni (Burch, 1965): synonym of Myurellopsis kilburni (R. D. Burch, 1965)
- Myurella lineaperlata Terryn & Holford, 2008: synonym of Punctoterebra lineaperlata (Terryn & Holford, 2008) (original combination)
- Myurella macgillivrayi E.A. Smith, 1873: synonym of Punctoterebra textilis (Hinds, 1844)
- Myurella minipulchra Bozzetti, 2008: synonym of Hastulopsis minipulchra (Bozzetti, 2008)
- Myurella miranda E.A. Smith, 1873: synonym of Pristiterebra miranda (E.A. Smith, 1873)
- Myurella monicae (Terryn, 2005): synonym of Myurellopsis monicae (Terryn, 2005)
- Myurella myuros (Lamarck, 1822): synonym of Cinguloterebra commaculata (Gmelin, 1791)
- Myurella nathaliae (Drivas & Jay, 1988): synonym of Myurellopsis nathaliae (Drivas & Jay, 1988)
- Myurella okudai Poppe, Tagaro & Goto, 2018 : synonym of Profunditerebra okudai (Poppe, Tagaro & Goto, 2018)
- Myurella orientalis (Aubry, 1999): synonym of Profunditerebra orientalis (Aubry, 1999)
- Myurella parkinsoni (Cernohorsky & Bratcher, 1976): synonym of Myurellopsis parkinsoni (Bratcher & Cernohorsky, 1976)
- Myurella paucistrata E.A. Smith, 1873: synonym of Myurella paucistriata E.A. Smith, 1873
- Myurella paucistriata E.A. Smith, 1873: synonym of Myurellopsis paucistriata (E. A. Smith, 1873)
- Myurella pumilio E.A. Smith, 1873: synonym of Euterebra tantilla (E.A. Smith, 1873)
- Myurella rosacea (Pease, 1869): synonym of Punctoterebra rosacea (Pease, 1869)
- Myurella rufocinerea Carpenter, 1857: synonym of Terebra intertincta Hinds, 1844
- Myurella simplex Carpenter, 1865: synonym of Terebra hemphilli Vanatta, 1924
- Myurella solangeae Bozzetti, 2015 : synonym of Punctoterebra solangeae (Bozzetti, 2015)
- Myurella stearnsii (Pilsbry, 1891): synonym of Cinguloterebra stearnsii (Pilsbry, 1891)
- Myurella tantilla E.A. Smith, 1873: synonym of Euterebra tantilla (E.A. Smith, 1873)
- Myurella turrita E.A. Smith, 1873: synonym of Hastulopsis turrita (E.A. Smith, 1873)
- Myurella undulata (Gray, 1834): synonym of Myurellopsis undulata (Gray, 1834)
