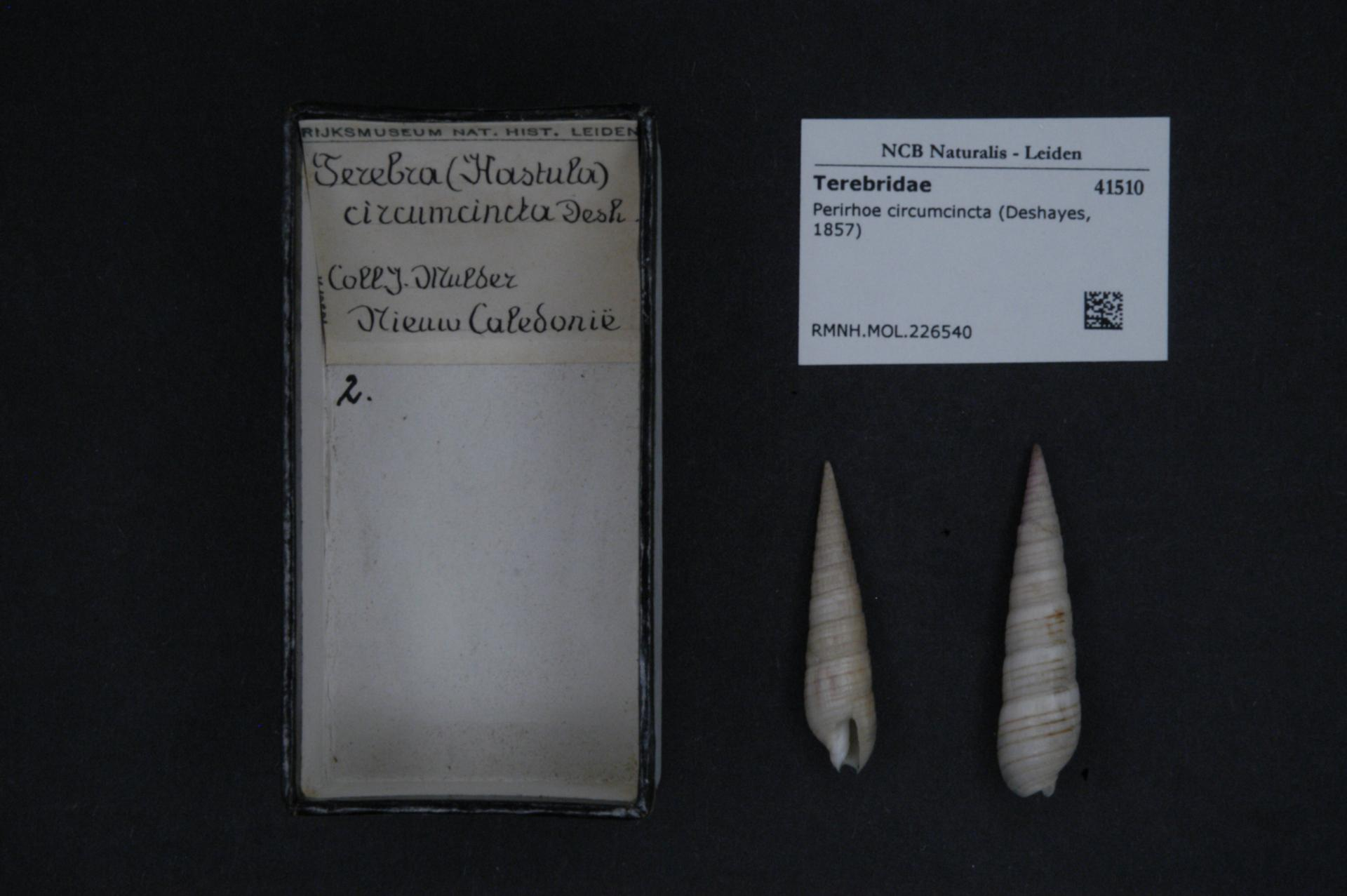
- Perirhoe circumcincta

Scientific classification
- Kingdom: Animalia
- Phylum: Mollusca
- Class: Gastropoda
- Subclass: Caenogastropoda
- Order: Neogastropoda
- Family: Terebridae
- Genus: Perirhoe; Dall, 1908

Type species
- Terebra circumcincta Deshayes, 1857

Species
- See text.

Synonyms
- Terebrina Bartsch, 1923; Terebra (Perirhoe) Dall, 1908 (original rank)

= Perirhoe =

Genus of gastropods

Perirhoe is a genus of sea snails, marine gastropod mollusks in the family Terebridae, the auger snails.

== Species ==
Species within the genus Perirhoe include:

- Perirhoe circumcincta (Deshayes, 1857)
- Perirhoe valentinae (Aubry, 1999)

Species brought into synonymy

- Subgenus Perirhoe (Dimidacus) Iredale, 1929: synonym of Terebra Bruguière, 1789
- Perirhoe cerithina (Lamarck, 1822): synonym of Oxymeris cerithina (Lamarck, 1822)
- Perirhoe eburnea (Hinds, 1844): synonym of Myurella eburnea (Hinds, 1844)
- Perirhoe exulta Iredale, 1931: synonym of Terebra punctatostriata Gray, 1834
- Perirhoe melamans Iredale, 1929: synonym of Terebra cingulifera Lamarck, 1822
