= Myurella reunionensis =

Scientific classification
- Kingdom: Animalia
- Phylum: Mollusca
- Class: Gastropoda
- Subclass: Caenogastropoda
- Order: Neogastropoda
- Family: Terebridae
- Genus: Myurella
- Species: M. reunionensis

Binomial name
- Myurella reunionensis (Bratcher & Cernohorsky, 1985)

Synonyms
- Clathroterebra reunionensis (Bratcher & Cernohorsky, 1985); Terebra reunionensis Bratcher & Cernohorsky, 1985

Species of gastropod

Myurella reunionensis is a species of sea snail, a marine gastropod mollusk in the family Terebridae, the auger snails.

== Distribution ==
This marine species occurs in the Indian Ocean off Réunion
