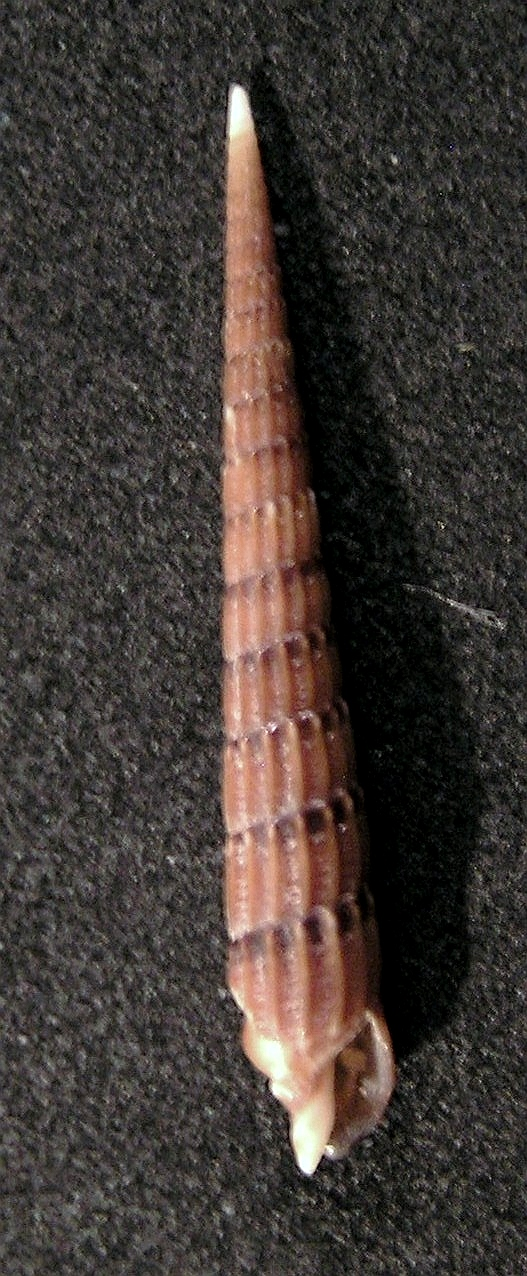
- Apertural view of a shell of Myurella mactanensis

Scientific classification
- Kingdom: Animalia
- Phylum: Mollusca
- Class: Gastropoda
- Subclass: Caenogastropoda
- Order: Neogastropoda
- Family: Terebridae
- Genus: Myurella
- Species: M. mactanensis

Binomial name
- Myurella mactanensis (Bratcher & Cernohorsky, 1982)

Synonyms
- Clathroterebra mactanensis (Bratcher & Cernohorsky, 1982); Terebra mactanensis Bratcher & Cernohorsky, 1982 (original combination)

= Myurella mactanensis =

Species of gastropod

Myurella mactanensis is a species of sea snail, a marine gastropod mollusk in the family Terebridae, the auger snails. The species was first described in 1982 by Bratcher and Cernohorsky.

== Description ==
It has a long, slender, and tapered shell, often featuring intricate patterns with brown, cream, and white hues. This species is typically found in tropical waters, particularly around the Philippines, where it inhabits sandy or muddy substrates near coral reefs. Like other auger snails, M. mactanensis is carnivorous, using its specialized radula and venomous harpoon-like tooth to prey on small marine organisms such as worms. It contributes to the biodiversity of the marine ecosystem while maintaining the balance of its prey populations.

== Distribution ==
This marine species occurs off Mactan Island, Cebu, Philippines
