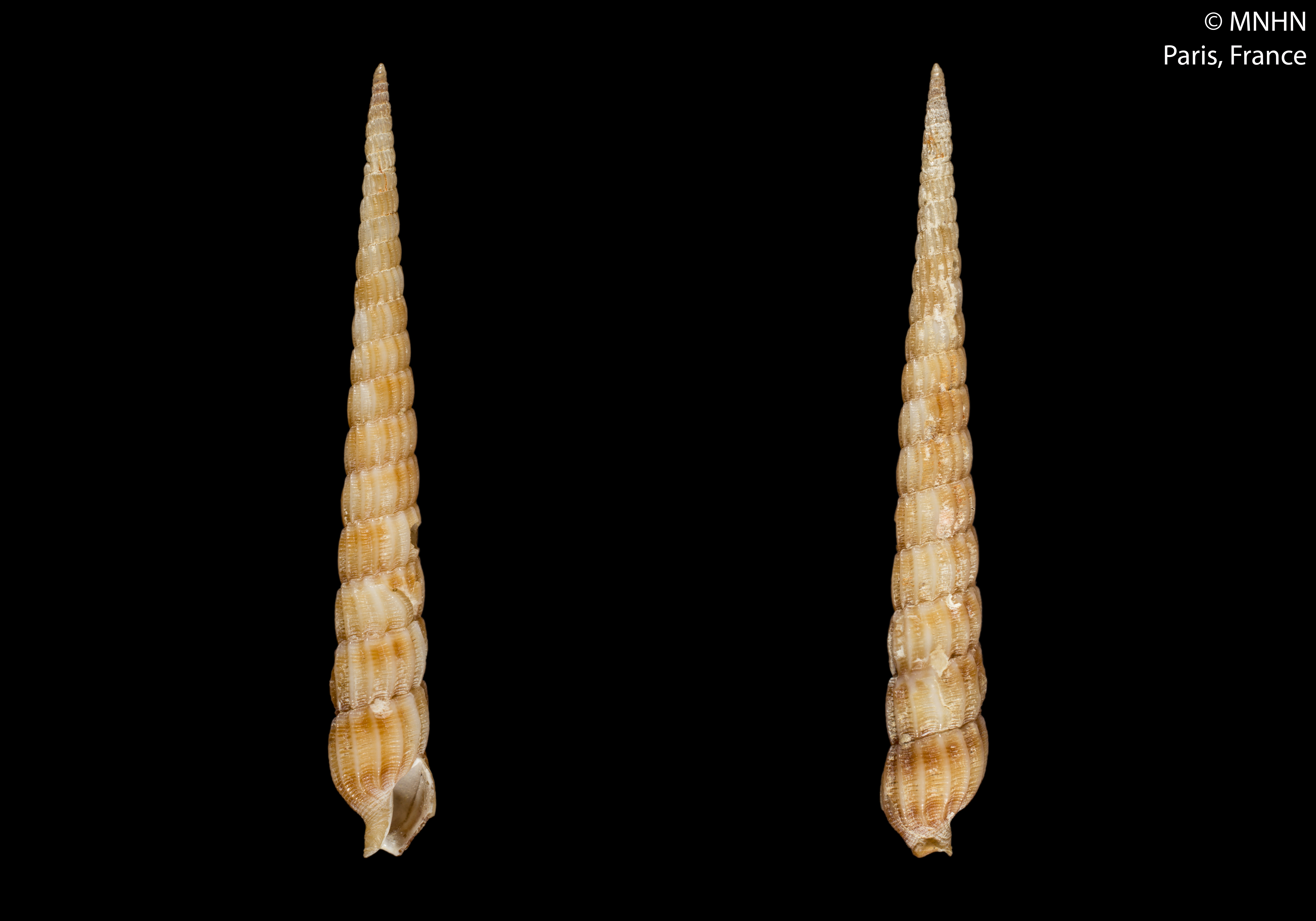
- Shell of Myurella suduirauti (holotype at MNHN, Paris)

Scientific classification
- Kingdom: Animalia
- Phylum: Mollusca
- Class: Gastropoda
- Subclass: Caenogastropoda
- Order: Neogastropoda
- Family: Terebridae
- Genus: Myurella
- Species: M. suduirauti

Binomial name
- Myurella suduirauti (Terryn & Conde, 2004)

Synonyms
- Clathroterebra suduirauti (Terryn & Conde, 2004); Terebra suduirauti Terryn & Conde, 2004

= Myurella suduirauti =

Species of gastropod

Myurella suduirauti is a species of sea snail, a marine gastropod mollusk in the family Terebridae, the auger snails.

== Distribution ==
This marine species occurs off the Philippines.
