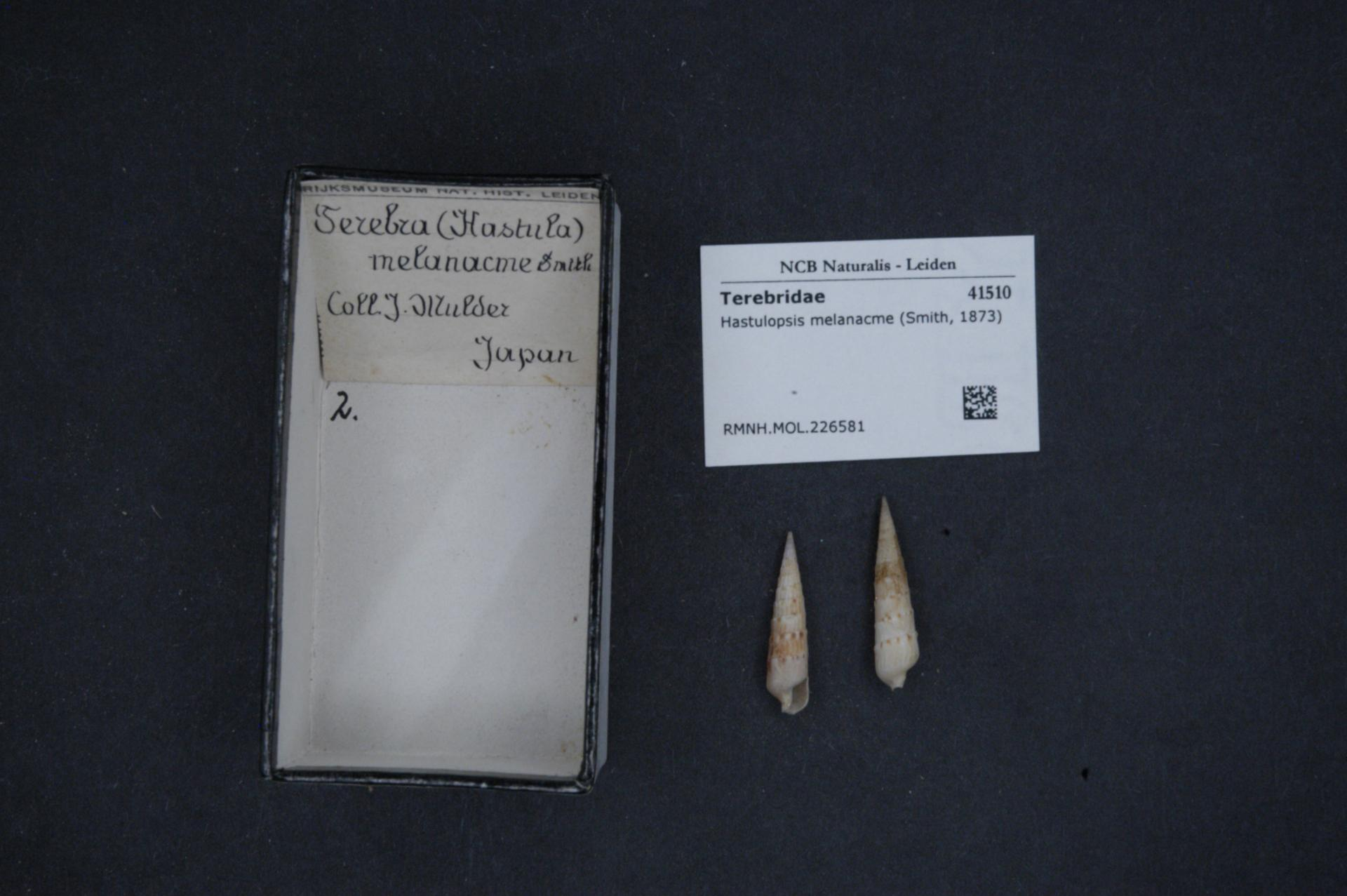

Scientific classification
- Kingdom: Animalia
- Phylum: Mollusca
- Class: Gastropoda
- Subclass: Caenogastropoda
- Order: Neogastropoda
- Family: Terebridae
- Genus: Hastulopsis
- Species: H. melanacme

Binomial name
- Hastulopsis melanacme (E.A. Smith, 1873)

Synonyms
- Terebra melanacme E.A. Smith, 1873

= Hastulopsis melanacme =

Species of gastropod

Hastulopsis melanacme is a species of sea snail, a marine gastropod mollusk in the family Terebridae, the auger snails.
