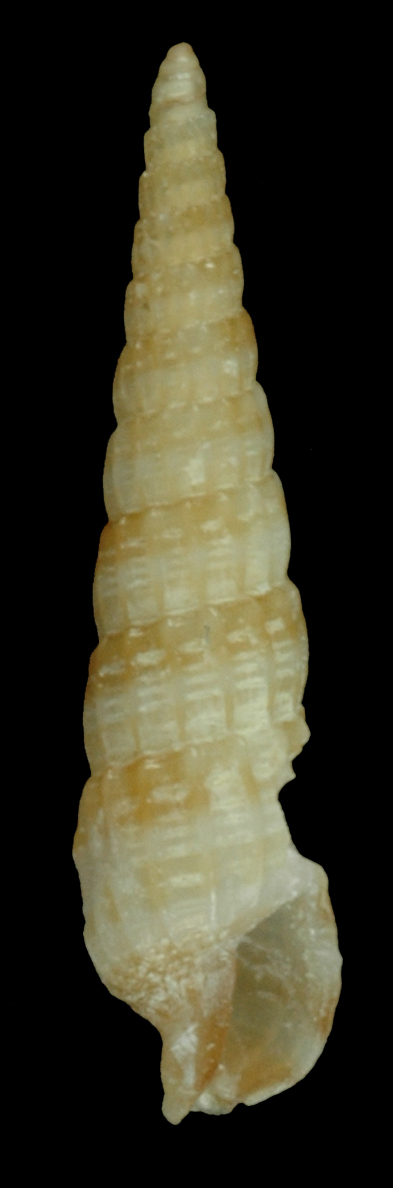
- Shell of Myurella dedonderi (specimen at MNHN, Paris)

Scientific classification
- Kingdom: Animalia
- Phylum: Mollusca
- Class: Gastropoda
- Subclass: Caenogastropoda
- Order: Neogastropoda
- Family: Terebridae
- Genus: Myurella
- Species: M. dedonderi

Binomial name
- Myurella dedonderi (Terryn, 2003)

Synonyms
- Clathroterebra dedonderi (Terryn, 2003); Terebra dedonderi Terryn, 2003 (original combination)

= Myurella dedonderi =

Species of gastropod

Myurella dedonderi is a species of sea snail, a marine gastropod mollusk in the family Terebridae, the auger snails.

== Distribution ==
This marine species occurs off Papua New Guinea
