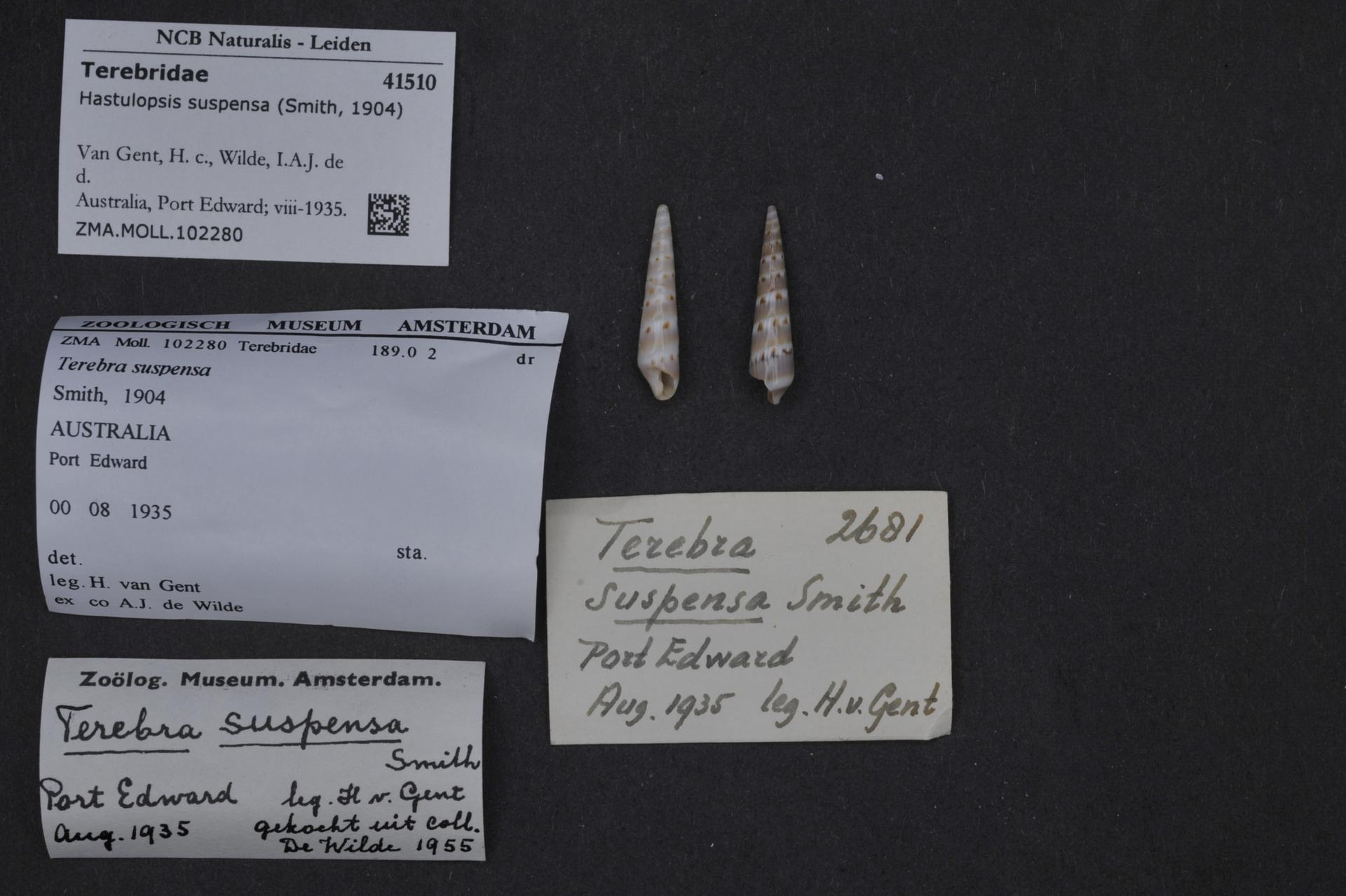

Scientific classification
- Kingdom: Animalia
- Phylum: Mollusca
- Class: Gastropoda
- Subclass: Caenogastropoda
- Order: Neogastropoda
- Family: Terebridae
- Genus: Hastulopsis
- Species: H. suspensa

Binomial name
- Hastulopsis suspensa (E.A. Smith, 1904)

Synonyms
- Terebra suspensa E.A. Smith, 1904; Terebra suspensa var. affinis Turton, 1932

= Hastulopsis suspensa =

Species of gastropod

Hastulopsis suspensa is a species of sea snail, a marine gastropod mollusk in the family Terebridae, the auger snails.
