= Hastulopsis gotoensis =

Scientific classification
- Kingdom: Animalia
- Phylum: Mollusca
- Class: Gastropoda
- Subclass: Caenogastropoda
- Order: Neogastropoda
- Family: Terebridae
- Genus: Hastulopsis
- Species: H. gotoensis

Binomial name
- Hastulopsis gotoensis (E.A. Smith, 1879)

Synonyms
- Hastulopsis gotoensis (E.A. Smith, 1961); Terebra gotoensis E.A. Smith, 1879

Species of gastropod

Hastulopsis gotoensis is a species of sea snail, a marine gastropod mollusk in the family Terebridae, the auger snails.
