= Myurella ningaloensis =

Scientific classification
- Kingdom: Animalia
- Phylum: Mollusca
- Class: Gastropoda
- Subclass: Caenogastropoda
- Order: Neogastropoda
- Family: Terebridae
- Genus: Myurella
- Species: M. ningaloensis

Binomial name
- Myurella ningaloensis (Aubry, 1999)

Synonyms
- Terebra ningaloensis Aubry, 1999

Species of gastropod

Myurella ningaloensis is a species of sea snail, a marine gastropod mollusk in the family Terebridae, the auger snails.

The status of this species is uncertain.
