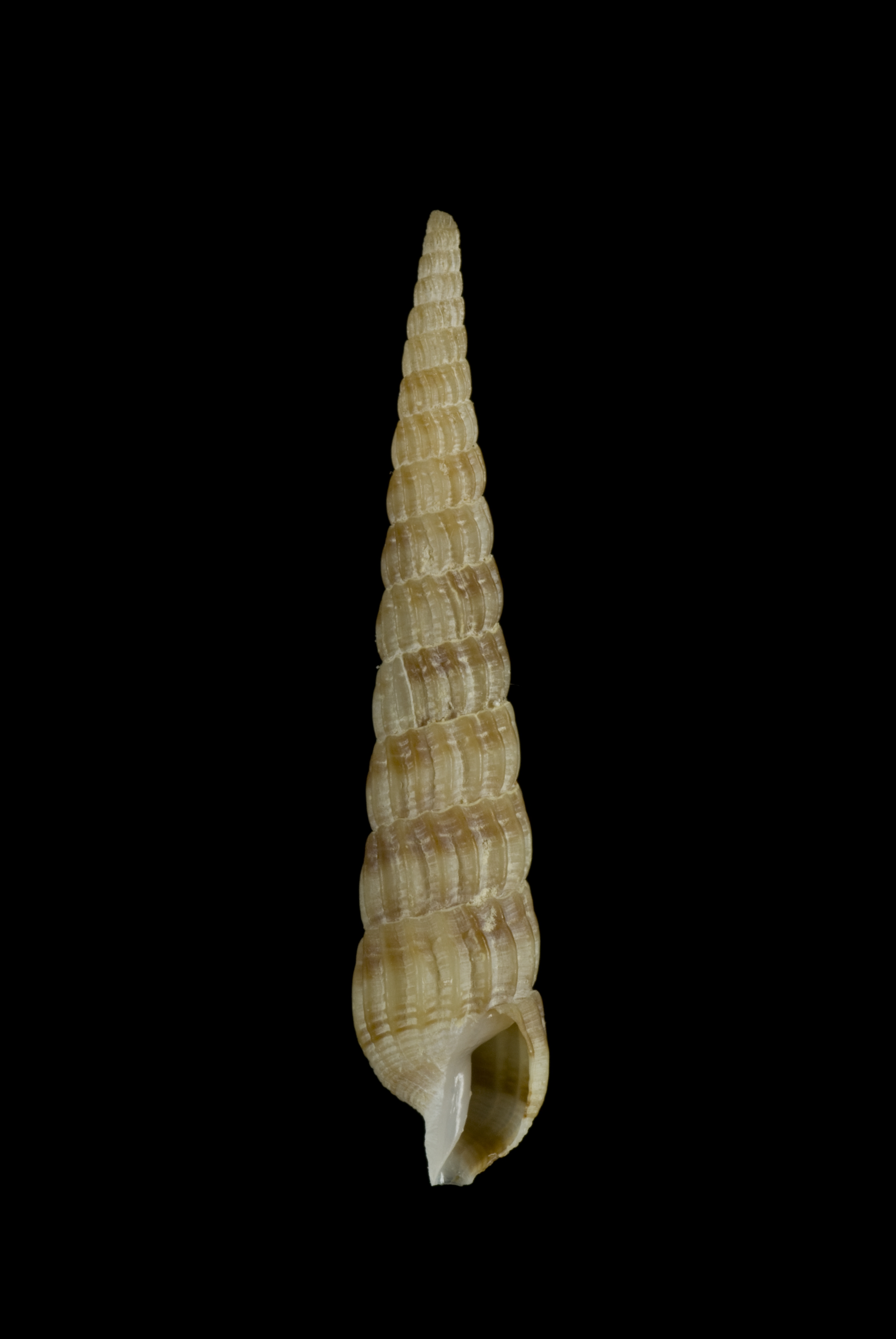
- Shell of Myurella pseudofortunei (specimen at MNHN, Paris)

Scientific classification
- Kingdom: Animalia
- Phylum: Mollusca
- Class: Gastropoda
- Subclass: Caenogastropoda
- Order: Neogastropoda
- Family: Terebridae
- Genus: Myurella
- Species: M. pseudofortunei

Binomial name
- Myurella pseudofortunei (Aubry, 2008)

Synonyms
- Clathroterebra pseudofortunei Aubry, 2008; Terebra pseudofortunei Aubry, 2008 (original combination)

= Myurella pseudofortunei =

Species of gastropod

Myurella pseudofortunei is a species of sea snail, a marine gastropod mollusk in the family Terebridae, the auger snails.

== Distribution ==
This marine species occurs off Papua New Guinea.
