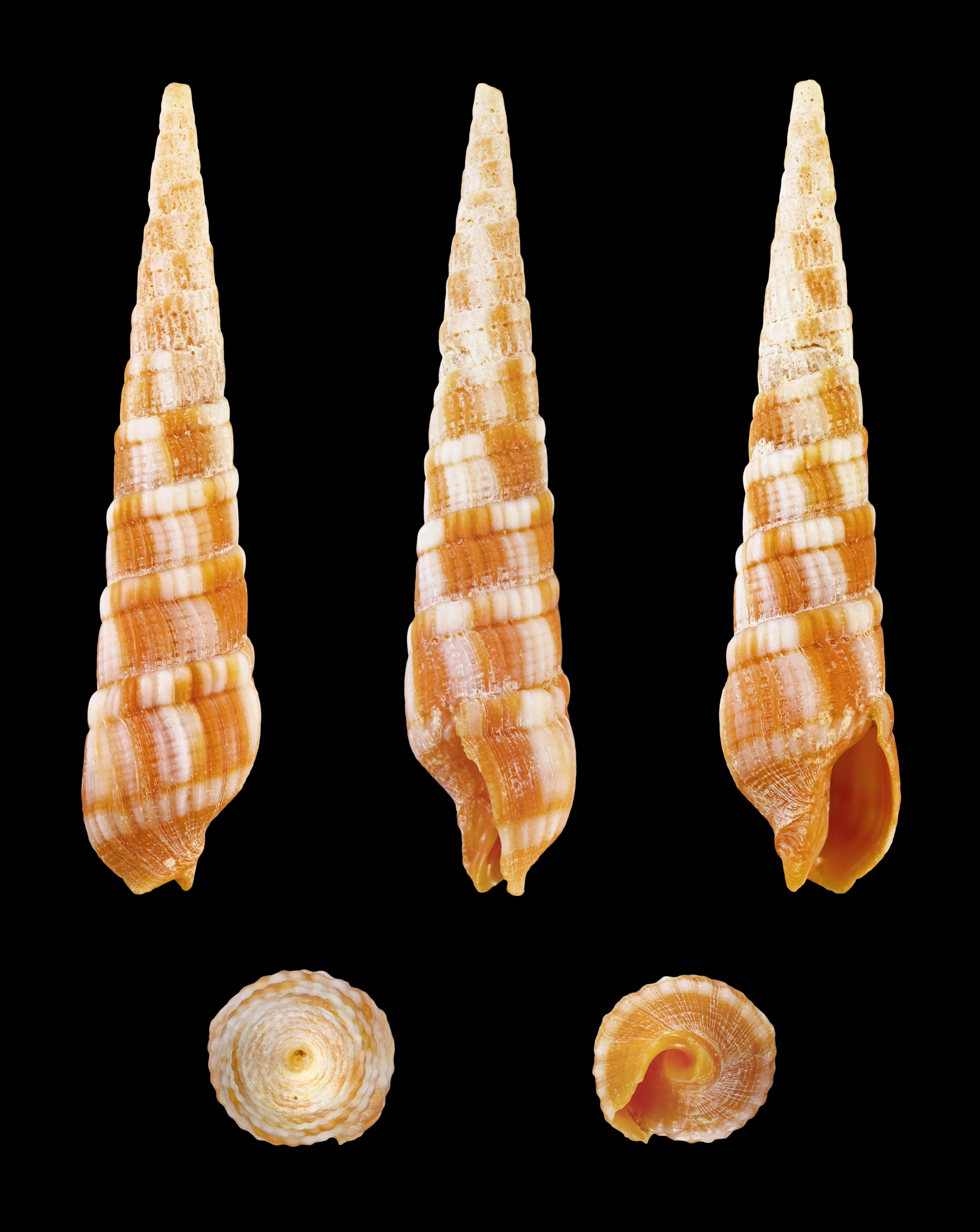

Scientific classification
- Kingdom: Animalia
- Phylum: Mollusca
- Class: Gastropoda
- Subclass: Caenogastropoda
- Order: Neogastropoda
- Family: Terebridae
- Genus: Myurella
- Species: M. nebulosa

Binomial name
- Myurella nebulosa (G.B. Sowerby I, 1825)

Synonyms
- Decorihastula nebulosa (G.B. Sowerby I, 1825); Terebra nebulosa G.B. Sowerby I, 1825

= Myurella nebulosa =

Species of gastropod

Myurella nebulosa is a species of sea snail, a marine gastropod mollusk in the family Terebridae, the auger snails.

== Distribution ==
This marine species occurs off Papua New Guinea.
