= Myurella fortunei =

Scientific classification
- Kingdom: Animalia
- Phylum: Mollusca
- Class: Gastropoda
- Subclass: Caenogastropoda
- Order: Neogastropoda
- Family: Terebridae
- Genus: Myurella
- Species: M. fortunei

Binomial name
- Myurella fortunei (Deshayes, 1857)

Synonyms
- Clathroterebra fortunei (Deshayes, 1857); Terebra fortunei Deshayes, 1857

Species of gastropod

Myurella fortunei is a species of sea snail, a marine gastropod mollusk in the family Terebridae, the auger snails.
