= Perirhoe valentinae =

Scientific classification
- Kingdom: Animalia
- Phylum: Mollusca
- Class: Gastropoda
- Subclass: Caenogastropoda
- Order: Neogastropoda
- Family: Terebridae
- Genus: Perirhoe
- Species: P. valentinae

Binomial name
- Perirhoe valentinae (Aubry, 1999)

Synonyms
- Terebra valentinae Aubry, 1999 (original combination)

Species of gastropod

Perirhoe valentinae is a species of sea snail, a marine gastropod mollusk in the family Terebridae, the auger snails.
