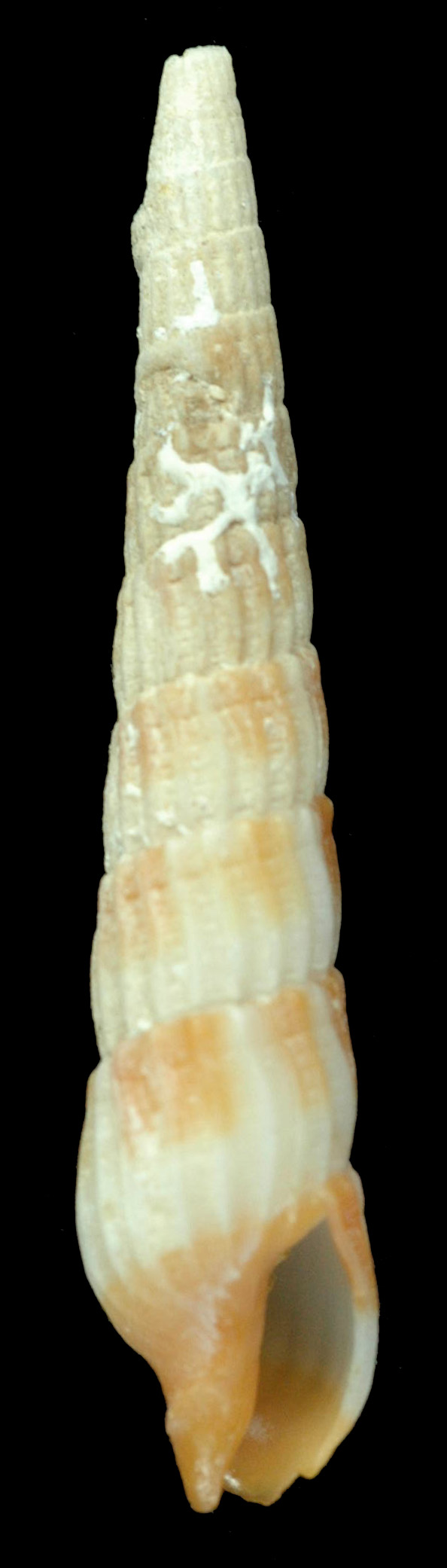
- Shell of Myurella wellsilviae (specimen at MNHN, Paris)

Scientific classification
- Kingdom: Animalia
- Phylum: Mollusca
- Class: Gastropoda
- Subclass: Caenogastropoda
- Order: Neogastropoda
- Family: Terebridae
- Genus: Myurella
- Species: M. wellsilviae

Binomial name
- Myurella wellsilviae (Aubry, 1994)

Synonyms
- Terebra wellsilviae Aubry, 1993 (original combination)

= Myurella wellsilviae =

Species of gastropod

Myurella wellsilviae is a species of sea snail, a marine gastropod mollusk in the family Terebridae, the auger snails.

== Distribution ==
This marine species occurs off Papua New Guinea.
