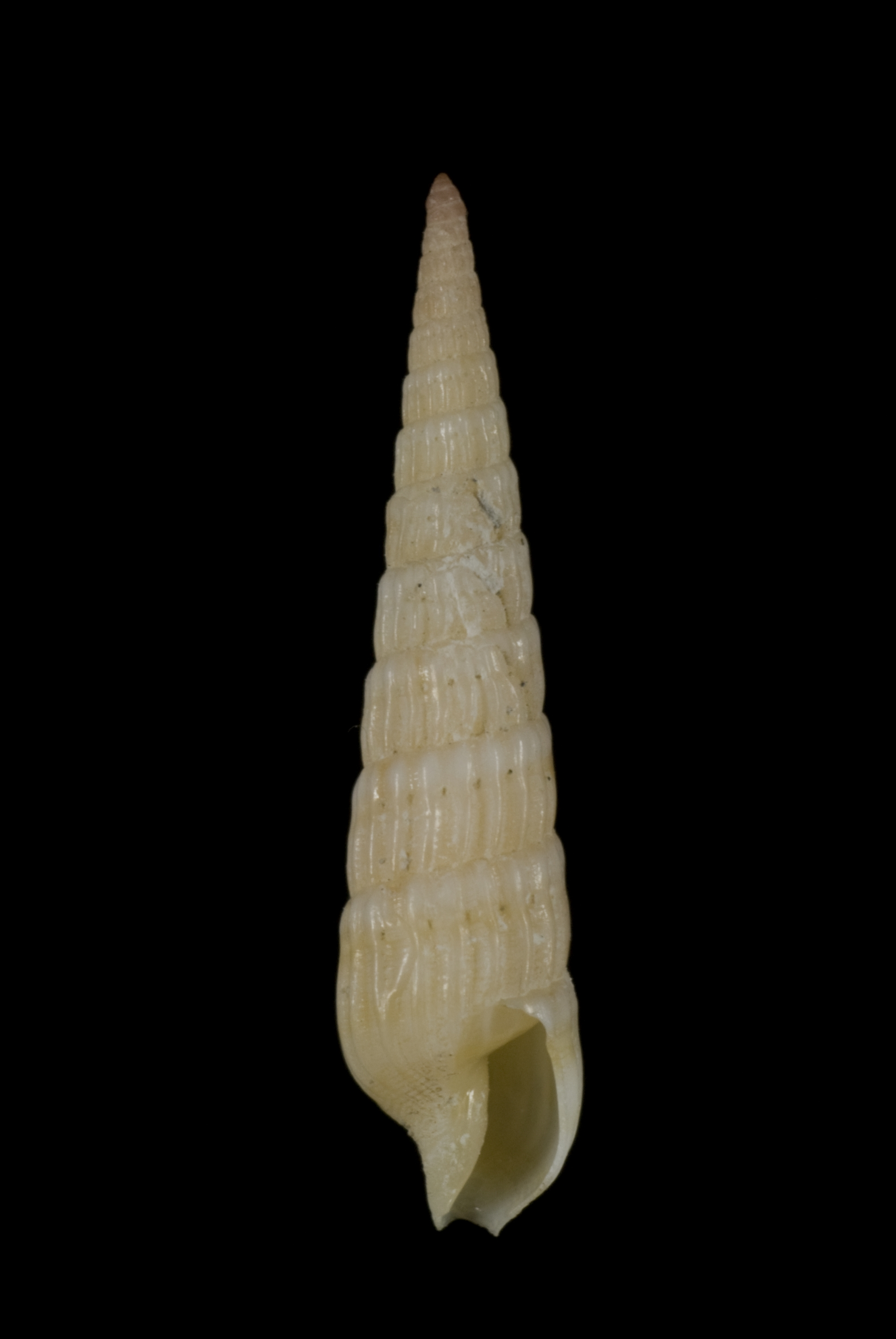

Scientific classification
- Kingdom: Animalia
- Phylum: Mollusca
- Class: Gastropoda
- Subclass: Caenogastropoda
- Order: Neogastropoda
- Family: Terebridae
- Genus: Myurella
- Species: M. flavofasciata

Binomial name
- Myurella flavofasciata (Pilsbry, 1921)

Synonyms
- Terebra flavofasciata Pilsbry, 1921

= Myurella flavofasciata =

Species of gastropod

Myurella flavofasciata is a species of sea snail, a marine gastropod mollusk in the family Terebridae, the auger snails.

== Distribution ==
This species occurs in the Red Sea and in the Indian Ocean off the Mascarene Basin; also off Papua New Guinea.

== Externaql links ==
- Pilsbry, H. A. (1921). Marine mollusks of Hawaii, VIII-XIII. Proceedings of the Academy of Natural Sciences of Philadelphia. 72: 296-328, pl. 12
- Fedosov, A. E.; Malcolm, G.; Terryn, Y.; Gorson, J.; Modica, M. V.; Holford, M.; Puillandre, N. (2020). Phylogenetic classification of the family Terebridae (Neogastropoda: Conoidea). Journal of Molluscan Studies. 85(4): 359-388
