= Hastulopsis whiteheadae =

Scientific classification
- Kingdom: Animalia
- Phylum: Mollusca
- Class: Gastropoda
- Subclass: Caenogastropoda
- Order: Neogastropoda
- Family: Terebridae
- Genus: Hastulopsis
- Species: H. whiteheadae

Binomial name
- Hastulopsis whiteheadae (Aubry & Marquet, 1995)

Synonyms
- Terebra whiteheadae Aubry & Marquet, 1995 (original combination)

Species of gastropod

Hastulopsis whiteheadae is a species of sea snail, a marine gastropod mollusk in the family Terebridae, the auger snails.
