= Myurella russoi =

Scientific classification
- Kingdom: Animalia
- Phylum: Mollusca
- Class: Gastropoda
- Subclass: Caenogastropoda
- Order: Neogastropoda
- Family: Terebridae
- Genus: Myurella
- Species: M. russoi

Binomial name
- Myurella russoi (Aubry, 1991)

Synonyms
- Clathroterebra russoi (Aubry, 1991); Terebra russoi Aubry, 1991 (original combination)

Species of gastropod

Myurella russoi is a species of sea snail, a marine gastropod mollusk in the family Terebridae, the auger snails.

== Description ==
Original description: "A slender but solid shell, of a dirty white colour tending towards beige. The 18 spiral convex whorls with deep sutural groove. 24 moderately curved and rounded axial ribs sweep longitudinally across the whorls, from one subsutural band to the next. This band, cut by axial ribs, delimited above by the sutural groove and below by small incisions which cross the ribs, is ornamented by characteristic brown markings found between the ribs. These spaces between the ribs on the body itself, on the other hand, are crossed by small spiral ribs, a net pattern. The body whorl with a brown band across the center which gradually fades above the sutural grooves. Elongated aperture, the siphonal canal narrow, the columella slightly curved with a few siphonal fascioles."

== Distribution ==
Locus typicus: "Bohol, Philippines."

This marine species occurs off the Philippines.
