= Hastulopsis loisae =

Scientific classification
- Kingdom: Animalia
- Phylum: Mollusca
- Class: Gastropoda
- Subclass: Caenogastropoda
- Order: Neogastropoda
- Family: Terebridae
- Genus: Hastulopsis
- Species: H. loisae

Binomial name
- Hastulopsis loisae (E.A. Smith, 1903)

Synonyms
- Terebra loisae E.A. Smith, 1903

Species of gastropod

Hastulopsis loisae is a species of sea snail, a marine gastropod mollusk in the family Terebridae, the auger snails.
