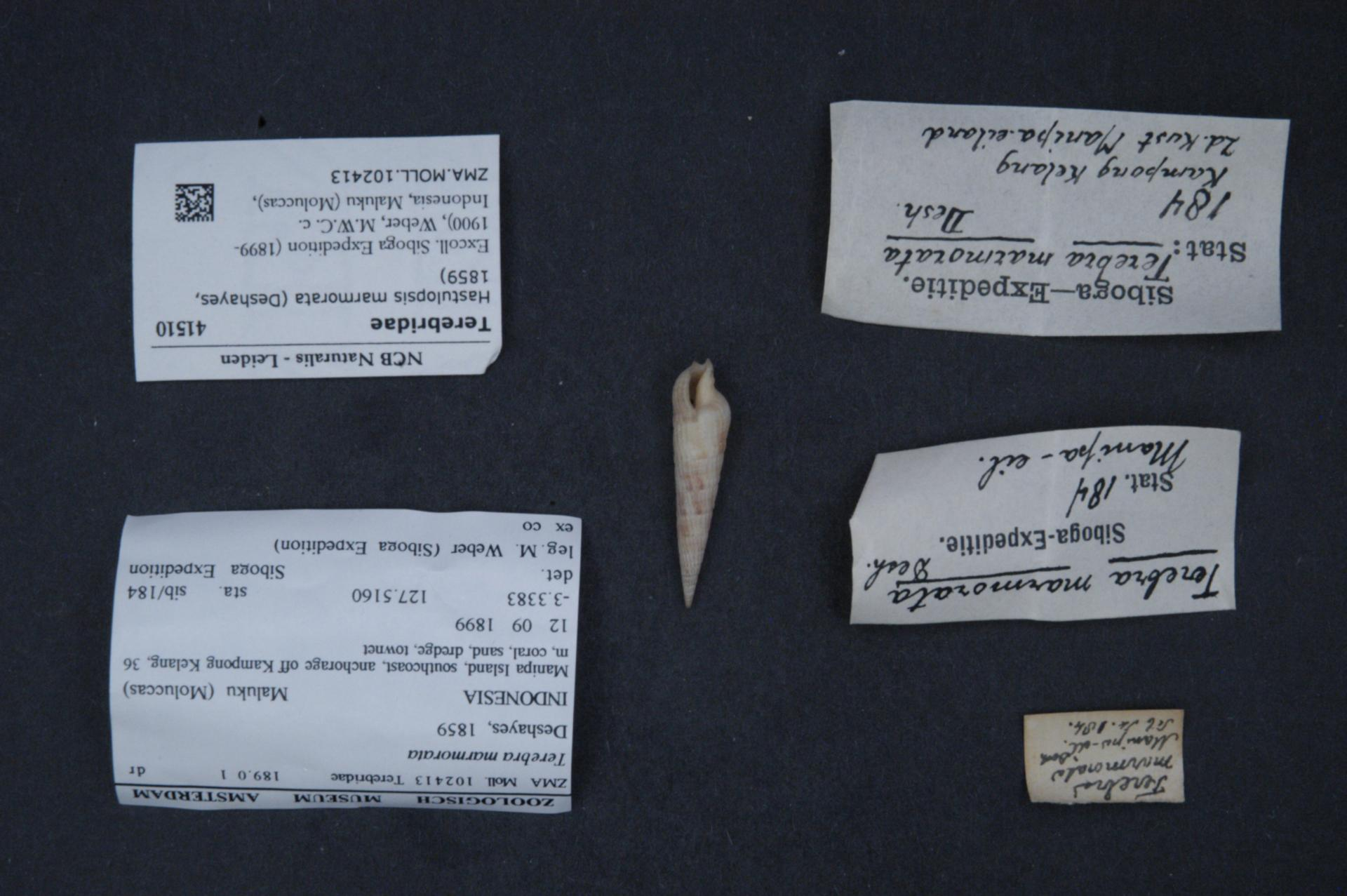

Scientific classification
- Kingdom: Animalia
- Phylum: Mollusca
- Class: Gastropoda
- Subclass: Caenogastropoda
- Order: Neogastropoda
- Family: Terebridae
- Genus: Hastulopsis
- Species: H. marmorata

Binomial name
- Hastulopsis marmorata (Deshayes, 1859)

Synonyms
- Terebra marmorata Deshayes, 1859

= Hastulopsis marmorata =

Species of gastropod

Hastulopsis marmorata is a species of sea snail, a marine gastropod mollusk in the family Terebridae, the auger snails.
