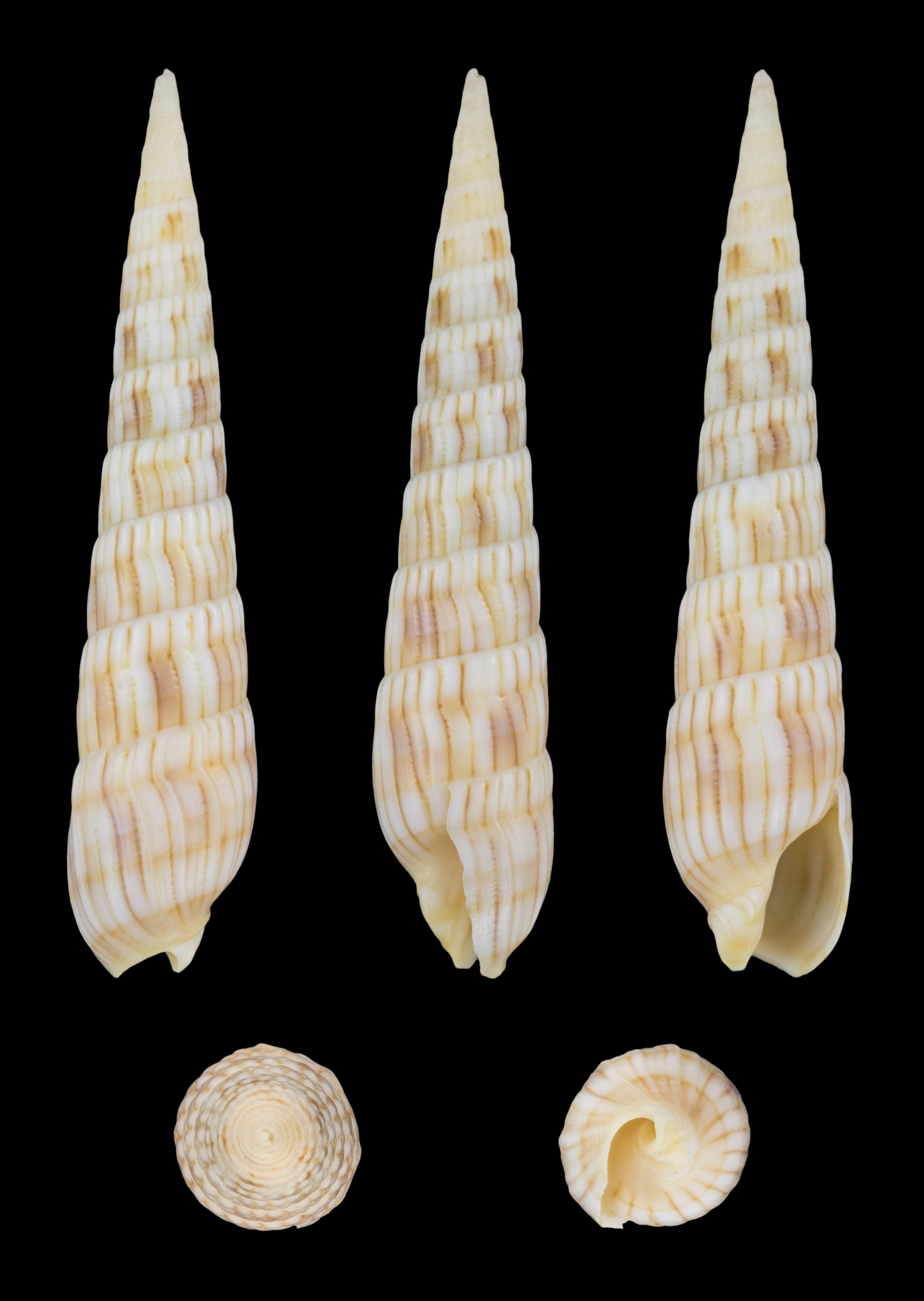

Scientific classification
- Kingdom: Animalia
- Phylum: Mollusca
- Class: Gastropoda
- Subclass: Caenogastropoda
- Order: Neogastropoda
- Family: Terebridae
- Genus: Myurella
- Species: M. affinis

Binomial name
- Myurella affinis (Gray, 1834)

Synonyms
- Decorihastula affinis Okutani, 1975; Terebra affinis Gray, 1834; Terebra affinis affinis Salvat & Rives, 1984; Terebra affinis puncticulata Salvat & Rives, 1984; Terebra flava Gray, 1834; Terebra peasii Deshayes, 1859; Terebra puncticulata Deshayes, 1859; Terebra striata Quoy & Gaimard, 1833 (junior homonym of Terebra striata Basterot, 1825)

= Myurella affinis =

Species of gastropod

Myurella affinis is a species of sea snail, a marine gastropod mollusk in the family Terebridae, the auger snails.
