= Hastulopsis elialae =

Scientific classification
- Kingdom: Animalia
- Phylum: Mollusca
- Class: Gastropoda
- Subclass: Caenogastropoda
- Order: Neogastropoda
- Family: Terebridae
- Genus: Hastulopsis
- Species: H. elialae

Binomial name
- Hastulopsis elialae (Aubry, 1994)

Synonyms
- Terebra elialae Aubry, 1994 (original combination)

Species of gastropod

Hastulopsis elialae is a species of sea snail, a marine gastropod mollusk in the family Terebridae, the auger snails.
