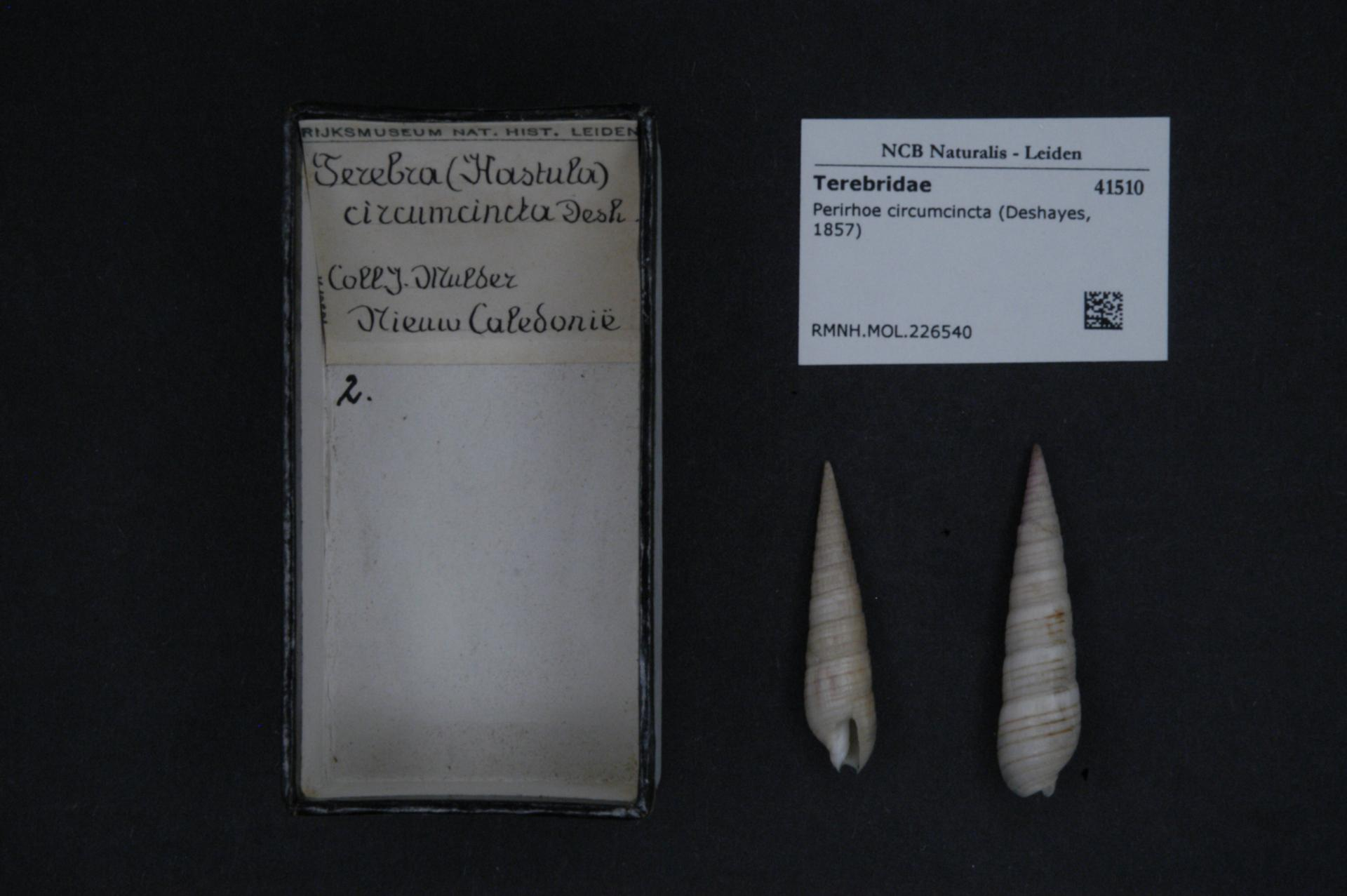

Scientific classification
- Kingdom: Animalia
- Phylum: Mollusca
- Class: Gastropoda
- Subclass: Caenogastropoda
- Order: Neogastropoda
- Family: Terebridae
- Genus: Perirhoe
- Species: P. circumcincta

Binomial name
- Perirhoe circumcincta (Deshayes, 1857)

Synonyms
- Terebra circumcincta Deshayes, 1857

= Perirhoe circumcincta =

Species of gastropod

Perirhoe circumcincta is a species of sea snail, a marine gastropod mollusk in the family Terebridae, the auger snails.

== Distribution ==
This species is found in the western Pacific: in northern Australia, New Caledonia, and the North Island of New Zealand.
