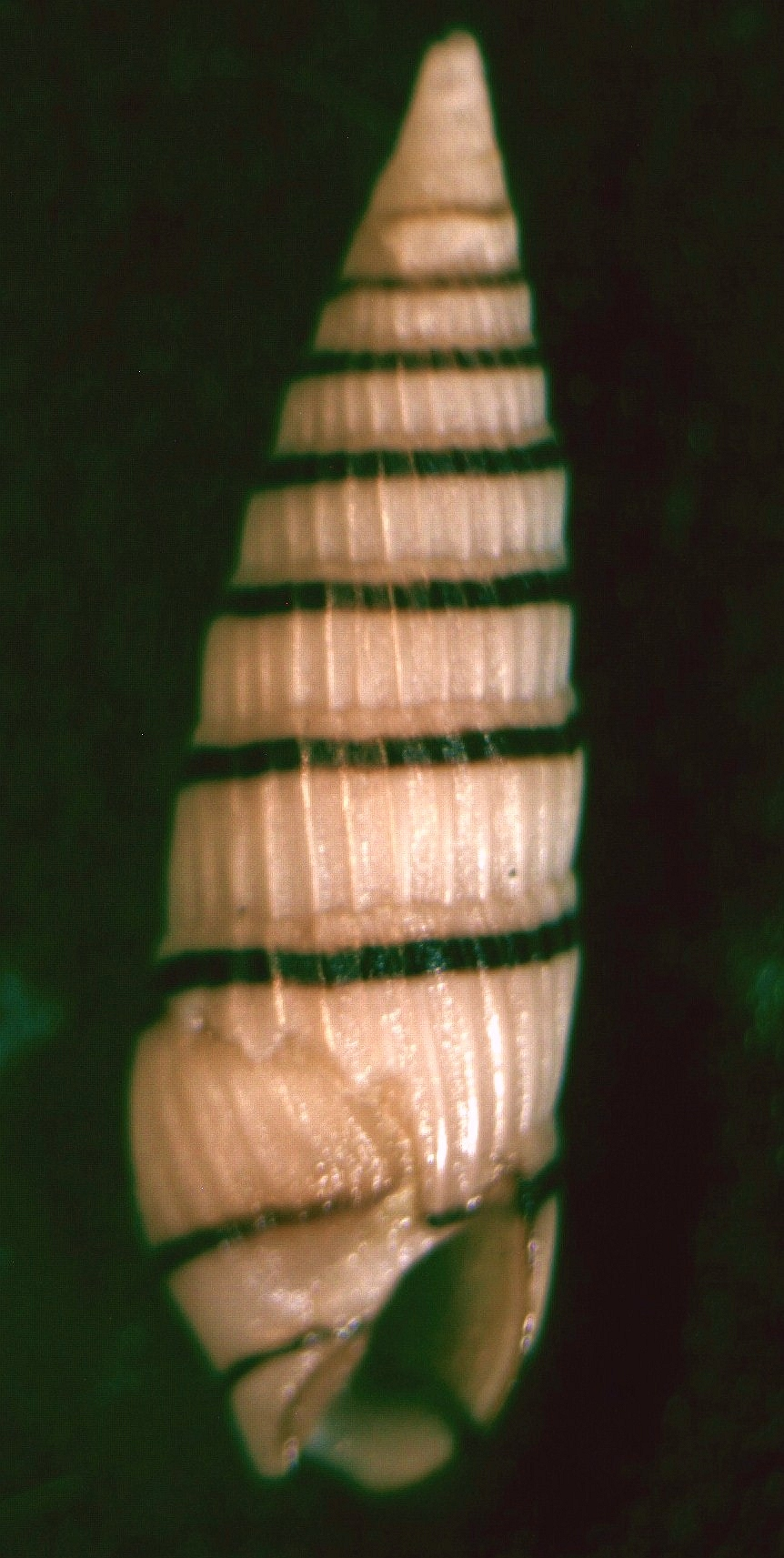

Scientific classification
- Kingdom: Animalia
- Phylum: Mollusca
- Class: Gastropoda
- Subclass: Caenogastropoda
- Order: Neogastropoda
- Family: Terebridae
- Genus: Myurella
- Species: M. pygmaea

Binomial name
- Myurella pygmaea (Hinds, 1844)

Synonyms
- Terebra pygmaea Hinds, 1844; Terenolla pygmaea (Hinds, 1844); Turbonilla princeps Preston, 1905

= Myurella pygmaea =

Species of gastropod

Myurella pygmaea, common name the pygmy auger, is a species of sea snail, a marine gastropod mollusk in the family Terebridae, the auger snails.

== Description ==
The length of the shell varies between 6 mm and 13 mm.

== Distribution ==
This marine species occurs in the tropical Indo-Pacific and off New Zealand.
