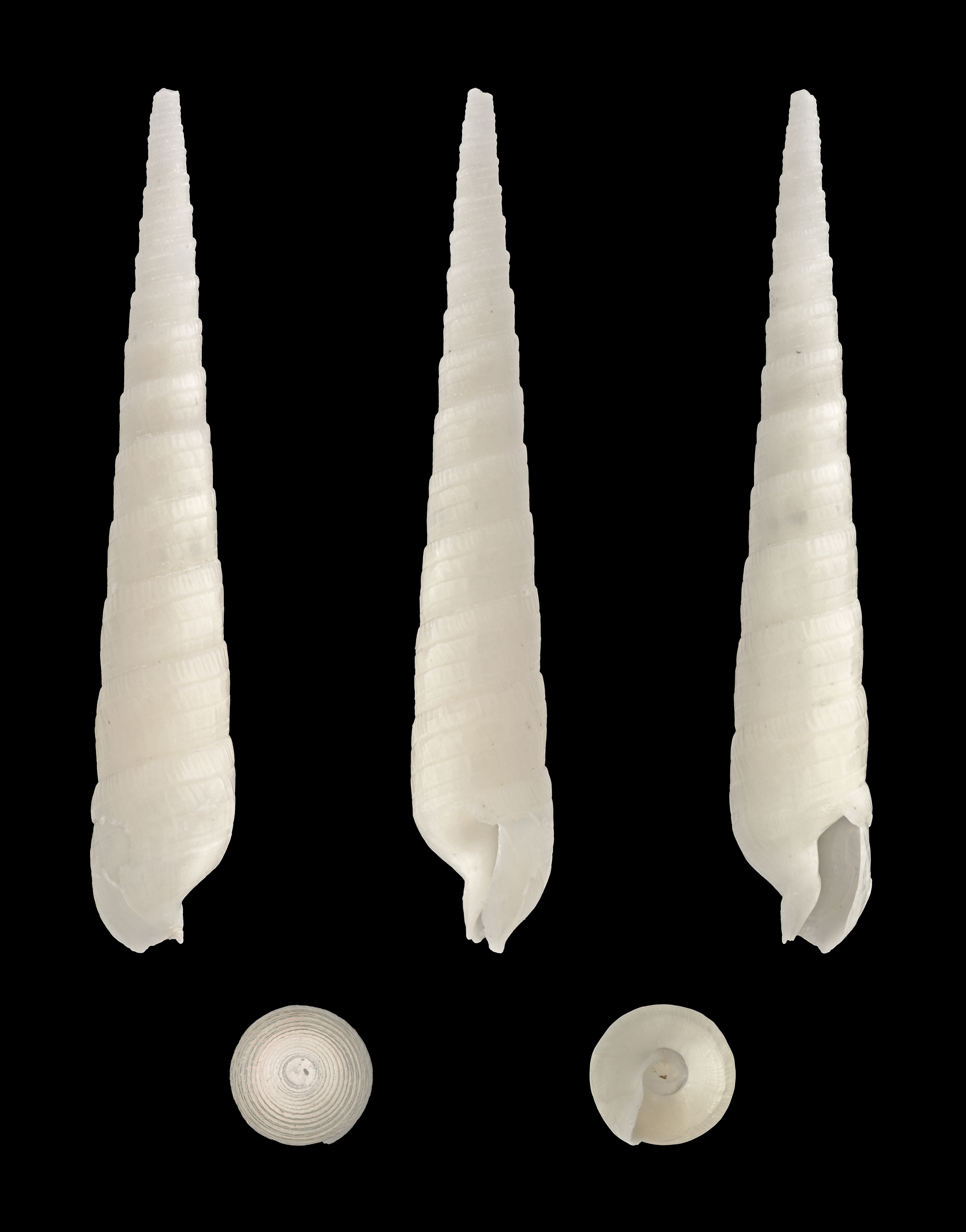
- A shell of Terebra cingulifera

Scientific classification
- Kingdom: Animalia
- Phylum: Mollusca
- Class: Gastropoda
- Subclass: Caenogastropoda
- Order: Neogastropoda
- Family: Terebridae
- Genus: Terebra
- Species: T. cingulifera

Binomial name
- Terebra cingulifera Lamarck, 1822

Synonyms
- Dimidacus cinguliferus (Lamarck, 1822); Perirhoe melamans Iredale, 1929; Terebra columnaris Deshayes, 1859; Terebra obsoleta Deshayes, 1859; Terebra punctulata Sowerby I, 1825; Terebra (Amanda-group) cingulifera Lamarck, 1822

= Terebra cingulifera =

Species of gastropod

Terebra cingulifera, common name the ringed auger, is a species of sea snail, a marine gastropod mollusc in the family Terebridae, the auger snails.

== Description ==
The length of the shell varies between 39 mm and 101 mm.

== Distribution ==
This marine species occurs in the Indian Ocean off Mauritius, Madagascar, Aldabra and the Mascarene Basin; in the Pacific off the Tuamotus.

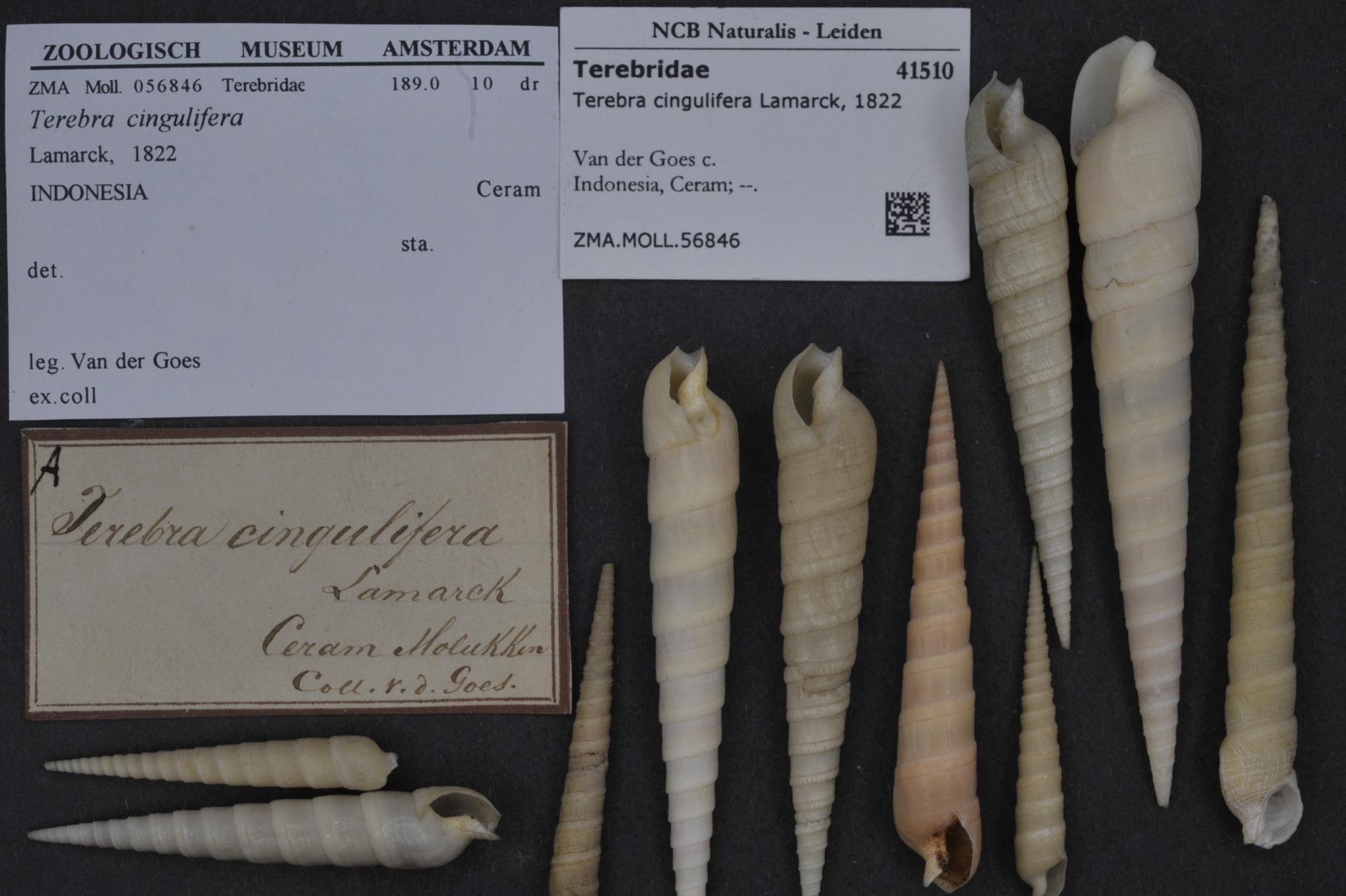
Museum specimens
