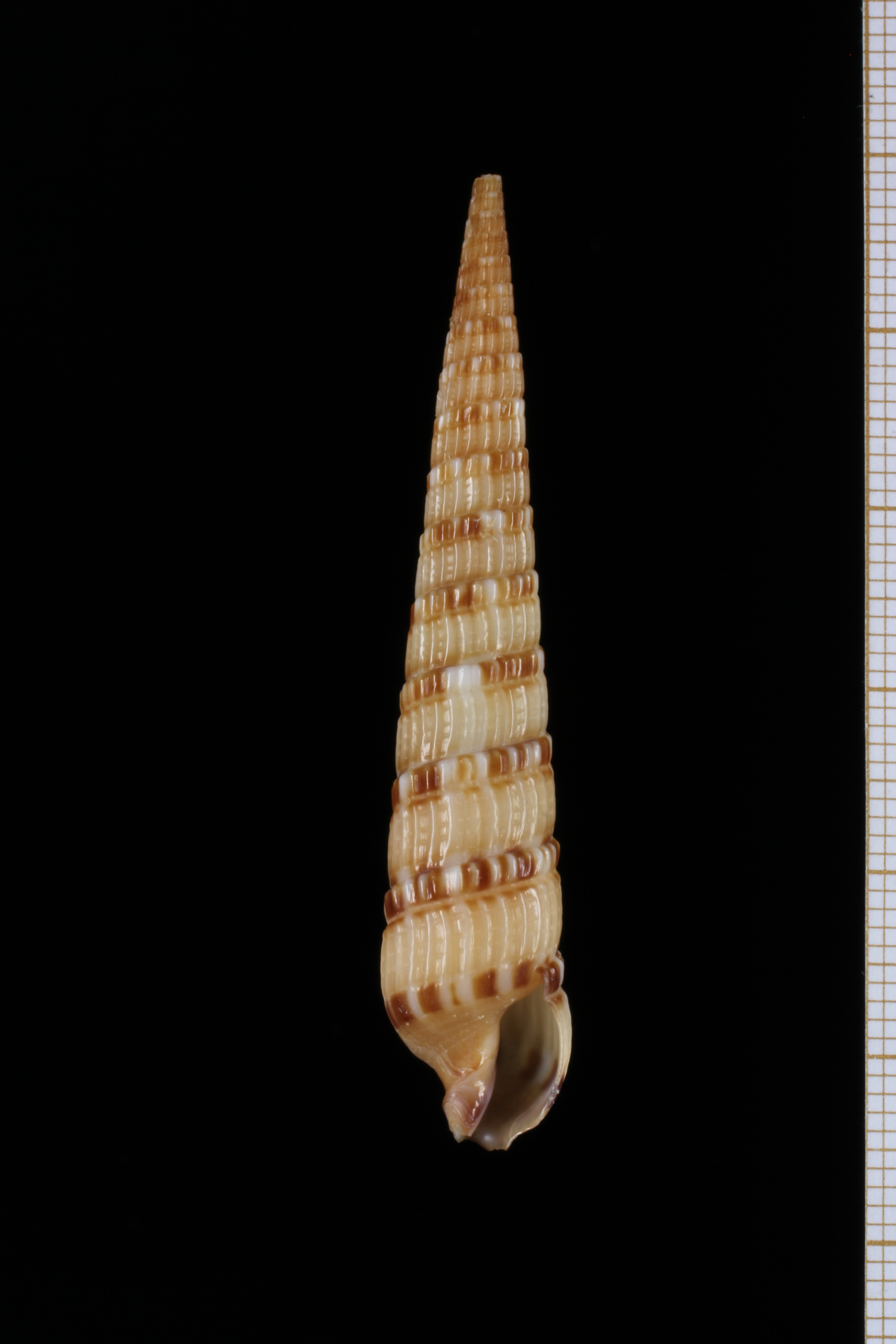
- Shell of Maculauger alveolatus (specimen at MNHN, Paris)

Scientific classification
- Kingdom: Animalia
- Phylum: Mollusca
- Class: Gastropoda
- Subclass: Caenogastropoda
- Order: Neogastropoda
- Superfamily: Conoidea
- Family: Terebridae
- Genus: Maculauger
- Species: M. alveolatus

Binomial name
- Maculauger alveolatus (Hinds, 1844)

Synonyms
- Hastulopsis alvelolata (Hinds, 1844); Hastulopsis alveolata (Hinds, 1844); Terebra alveolata Hinds, 1844

= Maculauger alveolatus =

Species of gastropod

Maculauger alveolatus is a species of sea snail, a marine gastropod mollusk in the family Terebridae, the auger snails.

== Distribution ==
The holotype was found in the Malacca Strait.
