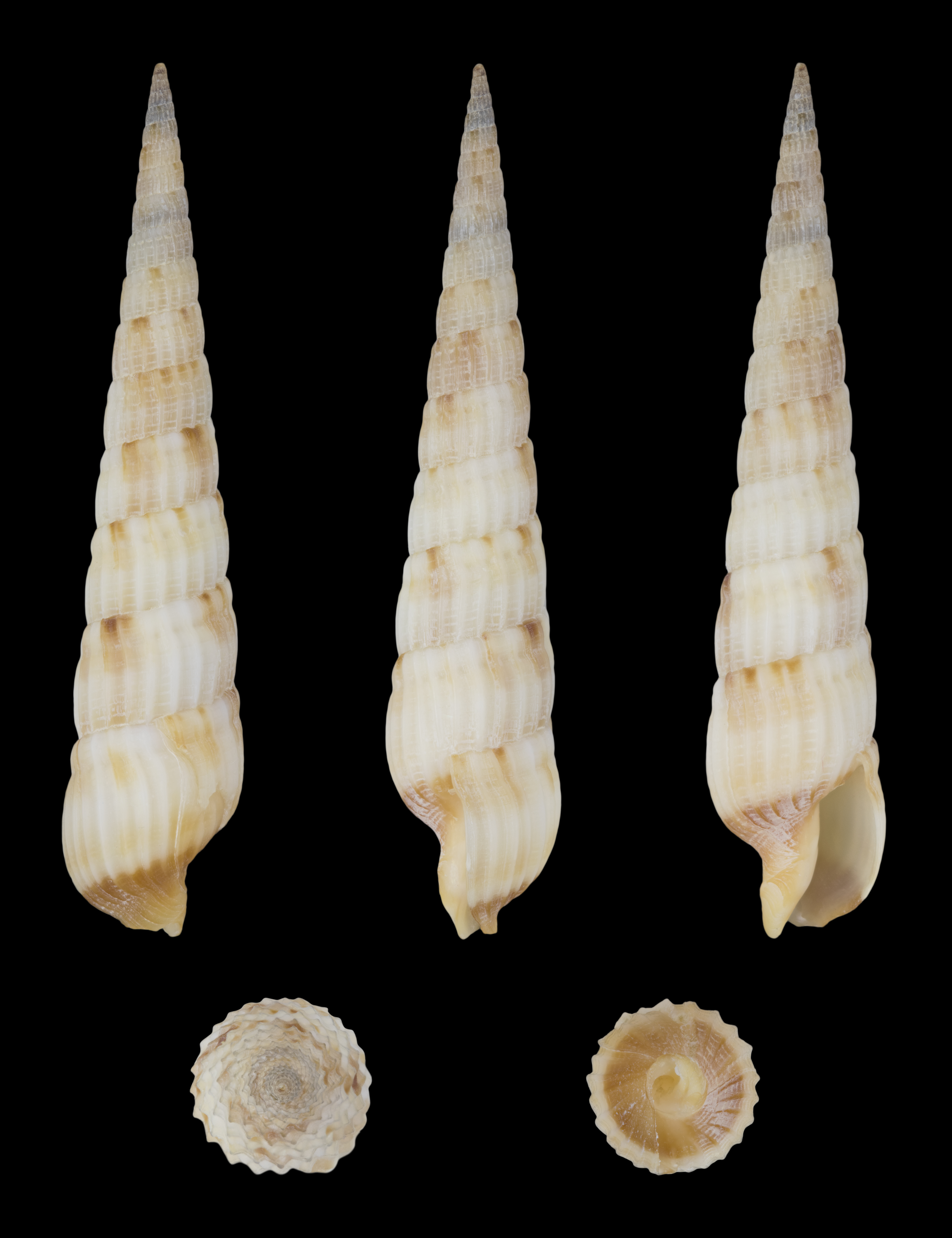

Scientific classification
- Kingdom: Animalia
- Phylum: Mollusca
- Class: Gastropoda
- Subclass: Caenogastropoda
- Order: Neogastropoda
- Family: Terebridae
- Genus: Myurella
- Species: M. amoena

Binomial name
- Myurella amoena (Deshayes, 1859)

Synonyms
- Hastulopsis amoena (Deshayes, 1859); Terebra amoena Deshayes, 1859

= Myurella amoena =

Species of gastropod

Myurella amoena is a species of sea snail, a marine gastropod mollusk in the family Terebridae, the auger snails.

== Description ==
The length of the shell varies between 22 mm and 56 mm.

== Distribution ==
This marine species occurs in the Red Sea; off Andamans, Hawaii and Papua New Guinea
