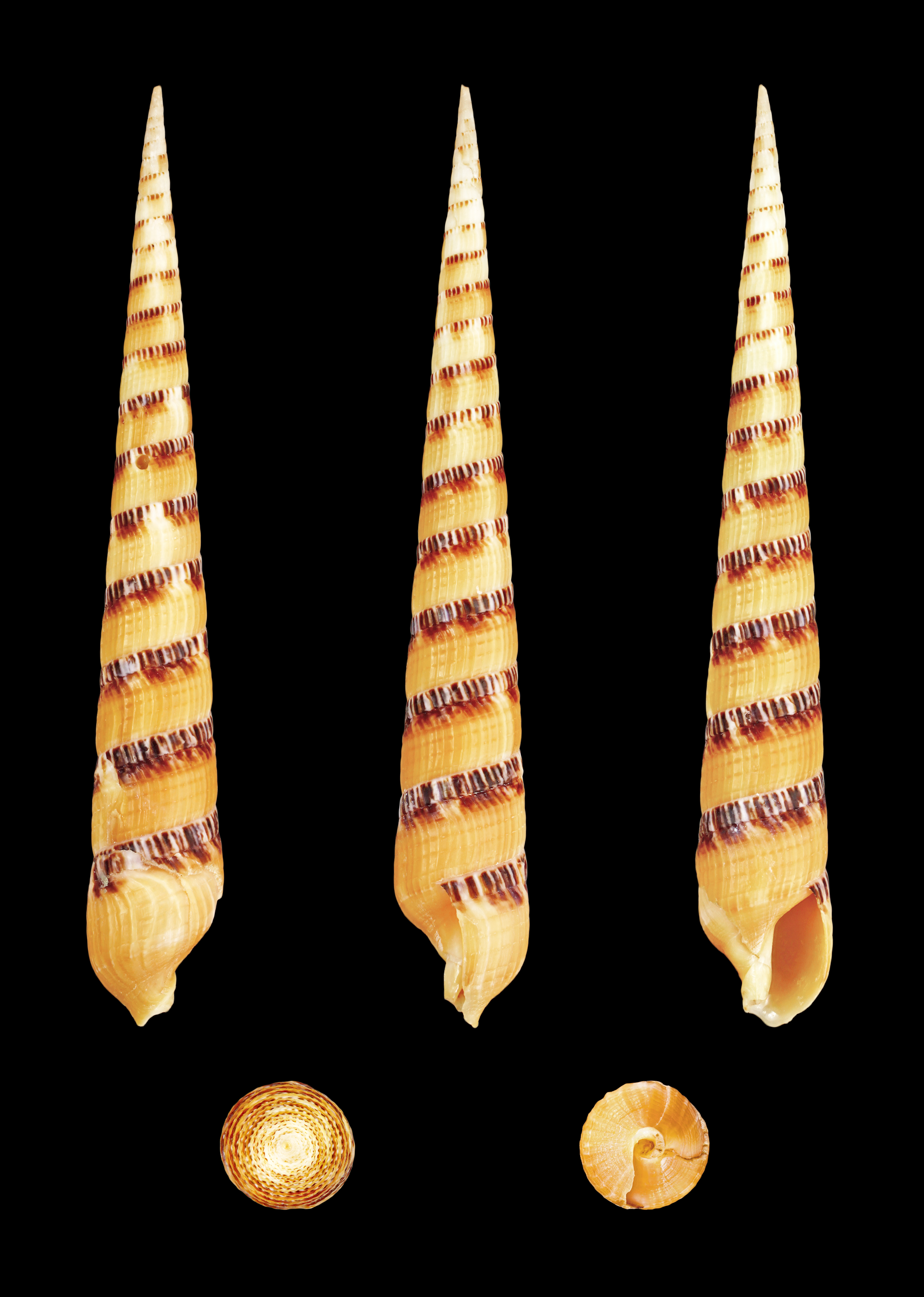

Scientific classification
- Kingdom: Animalia
- Phylum: Mollusca
- Class: Gastropoda
- Subclass: Caenogastropoda
- Order: Neogastropoda
- Family: Terebridae
- Genus: Myurella
- Species: M. pertusa

Binomial name
- Myurella pertusa (Born, 1778)

Synonyms
- Buccinum pertusum Born, 1778 (original combination); Decorihastula pertusa (Born, 1778); Hastulopsis pertusa (Born, 1778); Terebra pertusa (Born, 1778)

= Myurella pertusa =

Species of gastropod

Myurella pertusa, commonly named the perforated auger, is a species of sea snail, a marine gastropod mollusk in the family Terebridae, the auger snails.

== Description ==
The length of the shell varies between 30 mm and 115 mm.

== Distribution ==
This species occurs in the Indian Ocean off Aldabra and the Mascarene Basin.
