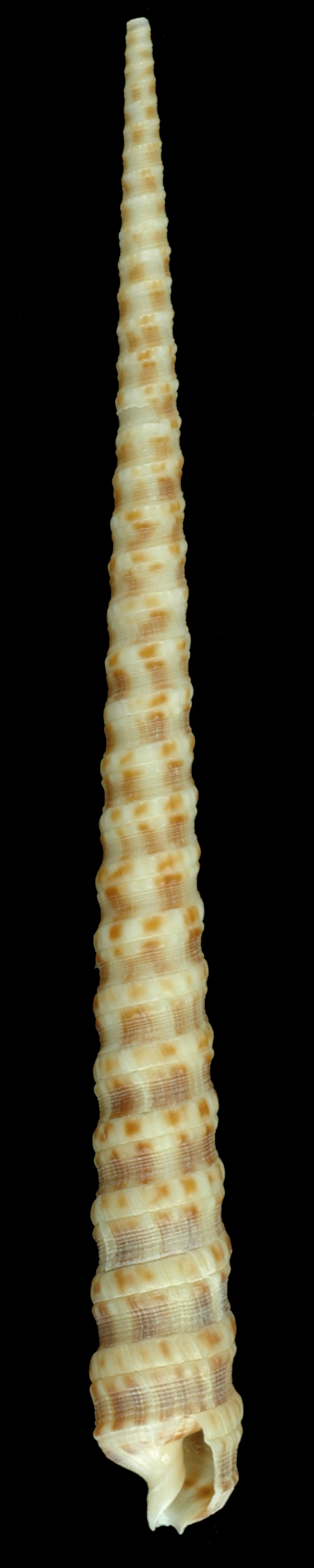
- Shell of Terebra stearnsii (specimen at MNHN, Paris)

Scientific classification
- Kingdom: Animalia
- Phylum: Mollusca
- Class: Gastropoda
- Subclass: Caenogastropoda
- Order: Neogastropoda
- Family: Terebridae
- Genus: Terebra
- Species: T. stearnsii

Binomial name
- Terebra stearnsii Pilsbry, 1891

Synonyms
- Cinguloterebra stearnsii (Pilsbry, 1891); Myurella stearnsii (Pilsbry, 1891)

= Terebra stearnsii =

Species of gastropod

Terebra stearnsii is a species of sea snail, a marine gastropod mollusc in the family Terebridae, the auger snails.

== Distribution ==
This marine species occurs in the Solomon Sea.
