= Partecosta tantilla =

Scientific classification
- Kingdom: Animalia
- Phylum: Mollusca
- Class: Gastropoda
- Subclass: Caenogastropoda
- Order: Neogastropoda
- Family: Terebridae
- Genus: Partecosta
- Species: P. tantilla

Binomial name
- Partecosta tantilla (E.A. Smith, 1873)

Synonyms
- Euterebra tantilla (E. A. Smith, 1873); Myurella pumilio E.A. Smith, 1873; Myurella tantilla E.A. Smith, 1873; Terebra (Myurella) tantilla E. A. Smith, 1873 (basionym); Terebra asiatica Ray, 1968; Terebra tantilla E.A. Smith, 1873

Species of gastropod

Partecosta tantilla is a species of sea snail, a marine gastropod mollusk in the family Terebridae, the auger snails.

== Distribution ==
This marine species occurs off Japan.
