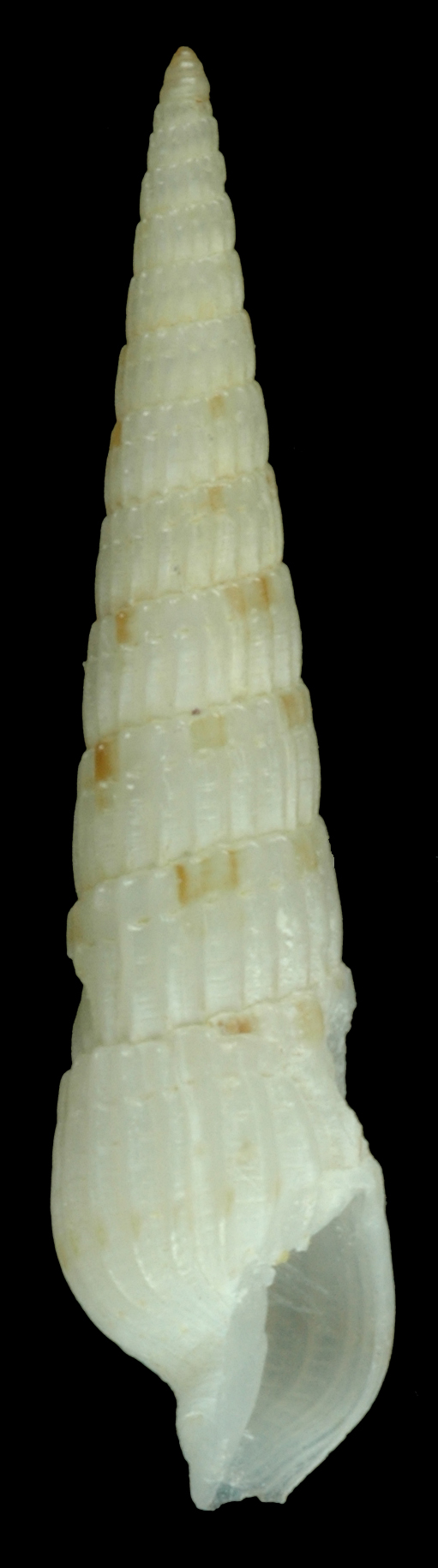

Scientific classification
- Kingdom: Animalia
- Phylum: Mollusca
- Class: Gastropoda
- Subclass: Caenogastropoda
- Order: Neogastropoda
- Family: Terebridae
- Genus: Myurella
- Species: M. bilineata

Binomial name
- Myurella bilineata (Aubry, 2004)

Synonyms
- Hastulopsis bilineata (Sprague, 2004); Terebra bilineata Sprague, 2004 (original combination)

= Myurella bilineata =

Species of gastropod

Myurella bilineata is a species of sea snail, a marine gastropod mollusk in the family Terebridae, the auger snails.

== Description ==
Myurella bilineata are mostly made of their shell, which varies between 20 and 30 mm.

== Distribution ==
This marine species occurs off the Philippines and Papua New Guinea.
