= Neoterebra intertincta =

Scientific classification
- Kingdom: Animalia
- Phylum: Mollusca
- Class: Gastropoda
- Subclass: Caenogastropoda
- Order: Neogastropoda
- Family: Terebridae
- Genus: Neoterebra
- Species: N. intertincta

Binomial name
- Neoterebra intertincta (Hinds, 1844)

Synonyms
- Myurella hindsii Carpenter, 1857; Myurella rufocinerea Carpenter, 1857; Terebra hindsii (Carpenter, 1857); Terebra intertincta Hinds, 1844 (original combination); Terebra malonei Vanatta, 1924; Terebra rufocinera (Carpenter, 1957)

Species of gastropod

Neoterebra intertincta is a species of sea snail, a marine gastropod mollusk in the family Terebridae, the auger snails.
