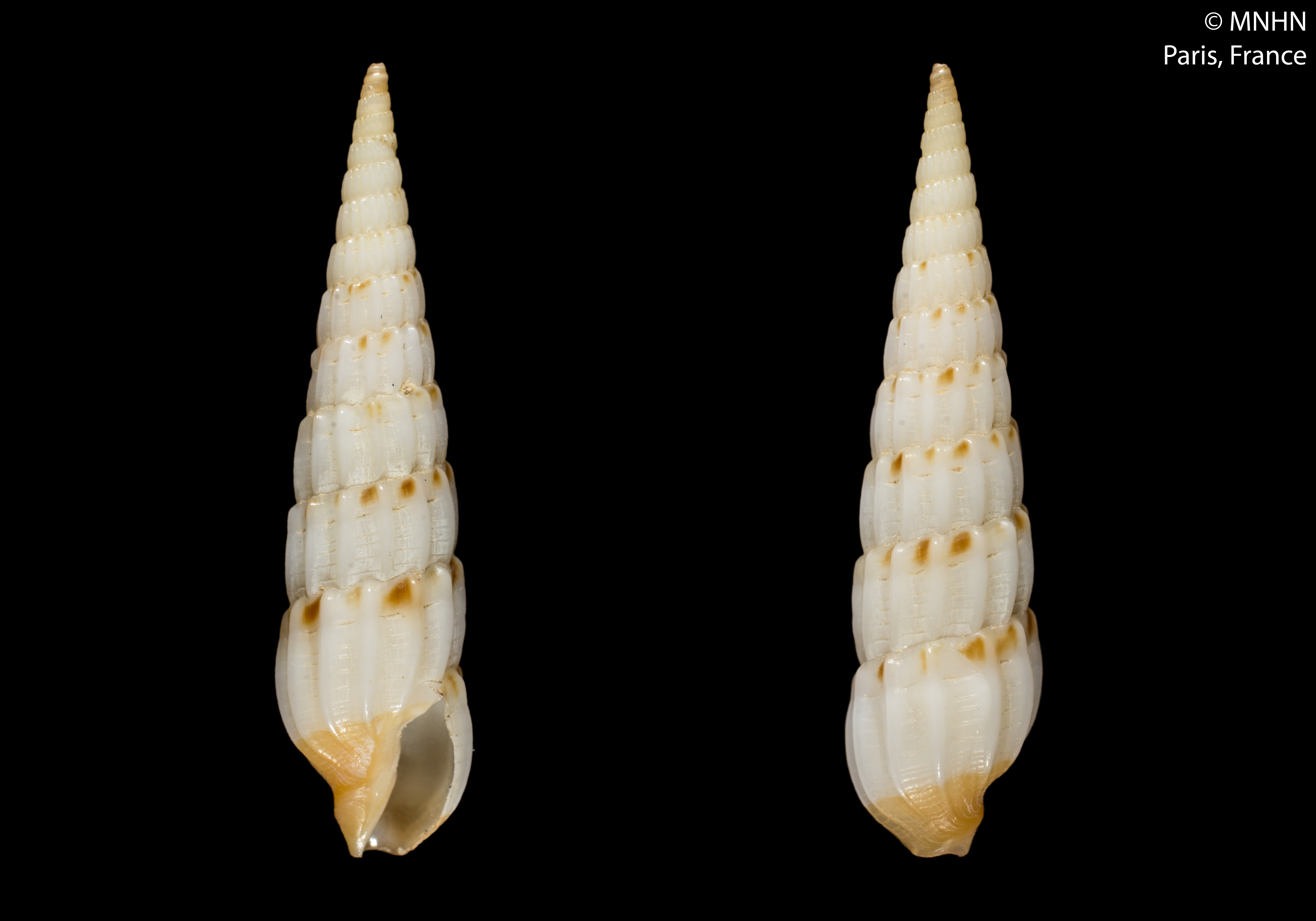
- Shell of Myurella burchi (holotype at MNHN, Paris)

Scientific classification
- Kingdom: Animalia
- Phylum: Mollusca
- Class: Gastropoda
- Subclass: Caenogastropoda
- Order: Neogastropoda
- Family: Terebridae
- Genus: Myurella
- Species: M. burchi

Binomial name
- Myurella burchi (Bratcher & Cernohorsky, 1982)

Synonyms
- Hastulopsis burchi (Bratcher & Cernohorsky, 1982); Terebra burchi Bratcher & Cernohorsky, 1982

= Myurella burchi =

Species of gastropod

Myurella burchi is a species of sea snail, a marine gastropod mollusk in the family Terebridae, the auger snails.

== Description ==
The length of the shell varies between 15 mm and 40 mm.

== Distribution ==
This marine species occurs in the Mozambique Channel off the island Mayotte; also off New Guinea and the Philippines.
