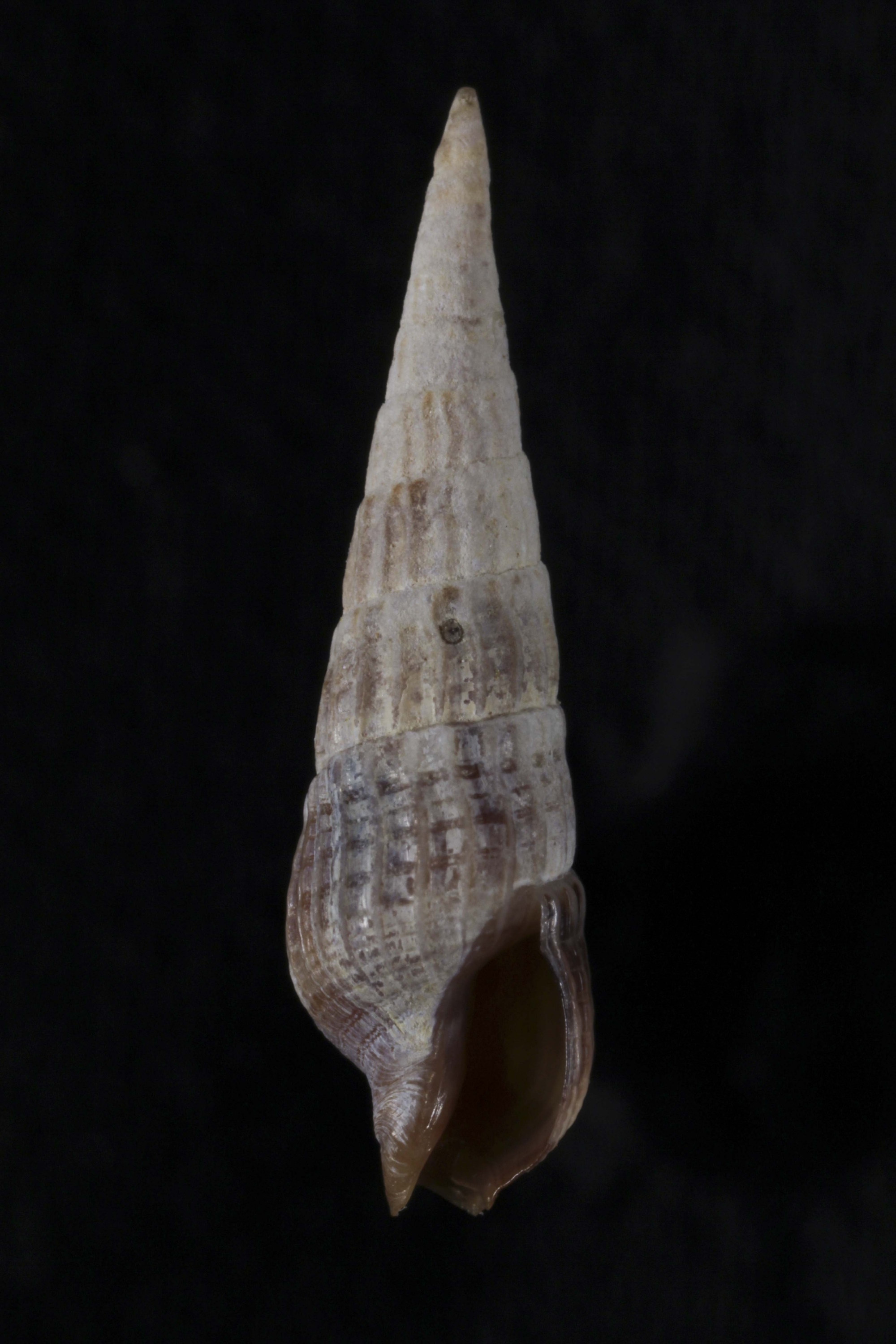
- Shell of Myurella conspersa (specimen at MNHN, Paris)

Scientific classification
- Kingdom: Animalia
- Phylum: Mollusca
- Class: Gastropoda
- Subclass: Caenogastropoda
- Order: Neogastropoda
- Family: Terebridae
- Genus: Myurella
- Species: M. conspersa

Binomial name
- Myurella conspersa (Hinds, 1844)

Synonyms
- Hastulopsis conspersa (Hinds, 1844); Hastulopsis hindsi (Deshayes, 1857); Terebra bruguieri Deshayes, 1859; Terebra conspersa Deshayes, 1857; Terebra conspersa Hinds, 1844; Terebra hindsi Deshayes, 1857

= Myurella conspersa =

Species of gastropod

Myurella conspersa is a species of sea snail, a marine gastropod mollusk in the family Terebridae, the auger snails.

== Description ==
The length of the shell varies between 25 mm and 53 mm. The shell has a conical shape with a steep incline. Most shells are either white, brown, or tan.

== Distribution ==
This marine species occurs off the Philippines, China, Papua New Guinea, and the Fiji Islands.
