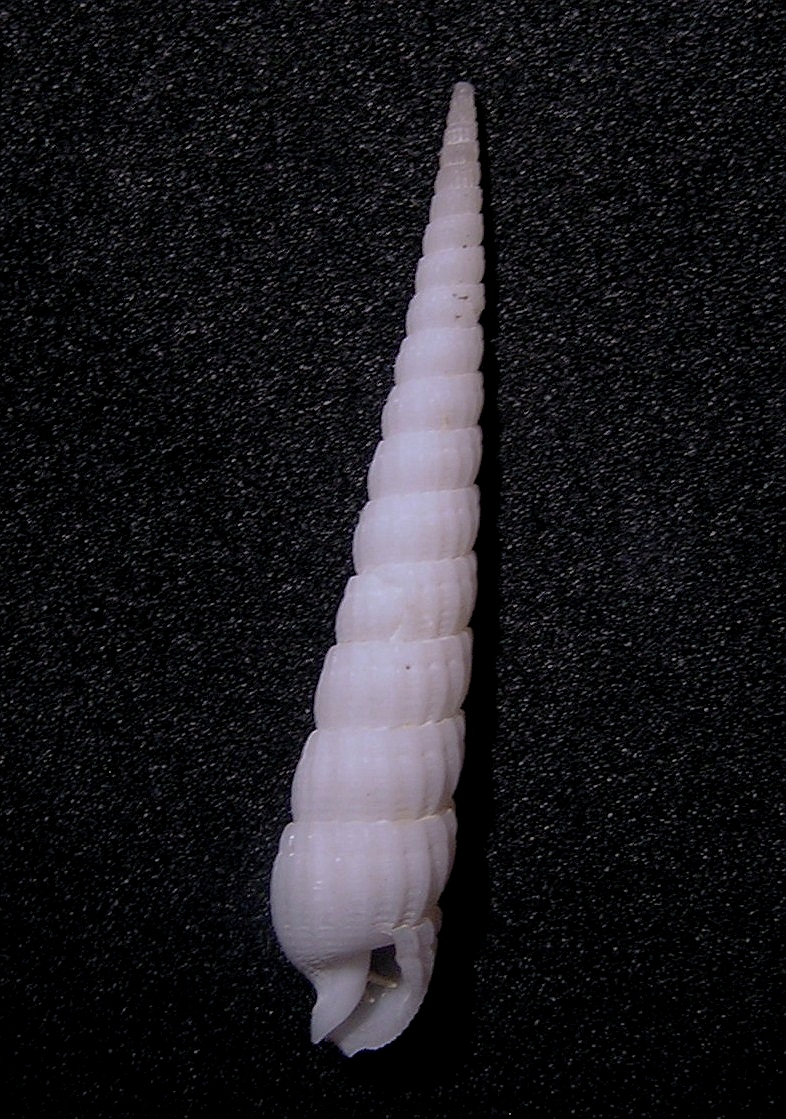
- Apertural view of a shell of Terebra fijiensis

Scientific classification
- Kingdom: Animalia
- Phylum: Mollusca
- Class: Gastropoda
- Subclass: Caenogastropoda
- Order: Neogastropoda
- Family: Terebridae
- Genus: Terebra
- Species: T. fijiensis

Binomial name
- Terebra fijiensis Smith, 1873

Synonyms
- Myurella fijiensis Smith, 1873; Terebra (Textilis-group) fijiensis (Smith, 1873); Terebra subangulata Deshayes, 1859

= Terebra fijiensis =

Species of gastropod

Terebra fijiensis is a species of sea snail, a marine gastropod mollusc in the family Terebridae, the auger snails.

== Description ==
The length of the shell varies between 20 mm and 45 mm.

== Distribution ==
This marine species occurs off the Philippines and the Fiji Islands.
