= Neoterebra guayaquilensis =

Scientific classification
- Kingdom: Animalia
- Phylum: Mollusca
- Class: Gastropoda
- Subclass: Caenogastropoda
- Order: Neogastropoda
- Family: Terebridae
- Genus: Neoterebra
- Species: N. guayaquilensis

Binomial name
- Neoterebra guayaquilensis (Smith, 1880)

Synonyms
- Myurella belcheri Smith, 1873; Myurella guayaquilensis E.A. Smith, 1880 (original combination); Terebra guayaquilensis (E. A. Smith, 1880); Terebra ira Pilsbry & Lowe, 1932

Species of gastropod

Neoterebra guayaquilensis is a species of sea snail, a marine gastropod mollusk in the family Terebridae, the auger snails.
