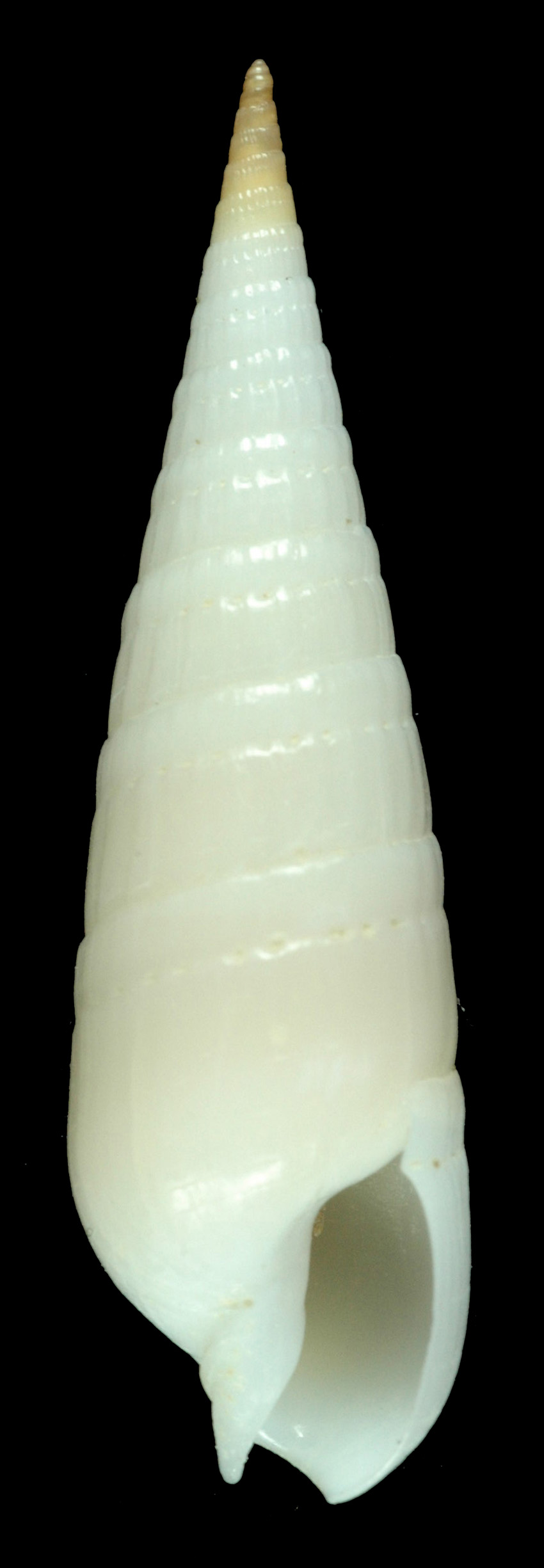
- Shell of Myurella eburnea (specimen at MNHN, Paris)

Scientific classification
- Kingdom: Animalia
- Phylum: Mollusca
- Class: Gastropoda
- Subclass: Caenogastropoda
- Order: Neogastropoda
- Family: Terebridae
- Genus: Myurella
- Species: M. eburnea

Binomial name
- Myurella eburnea (Hinds, 1844)

Synonyms
- Acus eburnea (Hinds, 1844); Perirhoe eburnea (Hinds, 1844); Terebra eburnea Hinds, 1844

= Myurella eburnea =

Species of gastropod

Myurella eburnea is a species of sea snail, a marine gastropod mollusk in the family Terebridae, the auger snails.

== Distribution ==
This marine species occurs off Papua New Guinea.
