= Myurella mindanaoensis =

Scientific classification
- Kingdom: Animalia
- Phylum: Mollusca
- Class: Gastropoda
- Subclass: Caenogastropoda
- Order: Neogastropoda
- Family: Terebridae
- Genus: Myurella
- Species: M. mindanaoensis

Binomial name
- Myurella mindanaoensis (Aubry, 2008)

Synonyms
- Hastulopsis mindanaoensis (Aubry, 2008); Terebra mindanaoensis Aubry, 2008 (original combination)

Species of gastropod

Myurella mindanaoensis is a species of sea snail, a marine gastropod mollusk in the family Terebridae, the auger snails.
