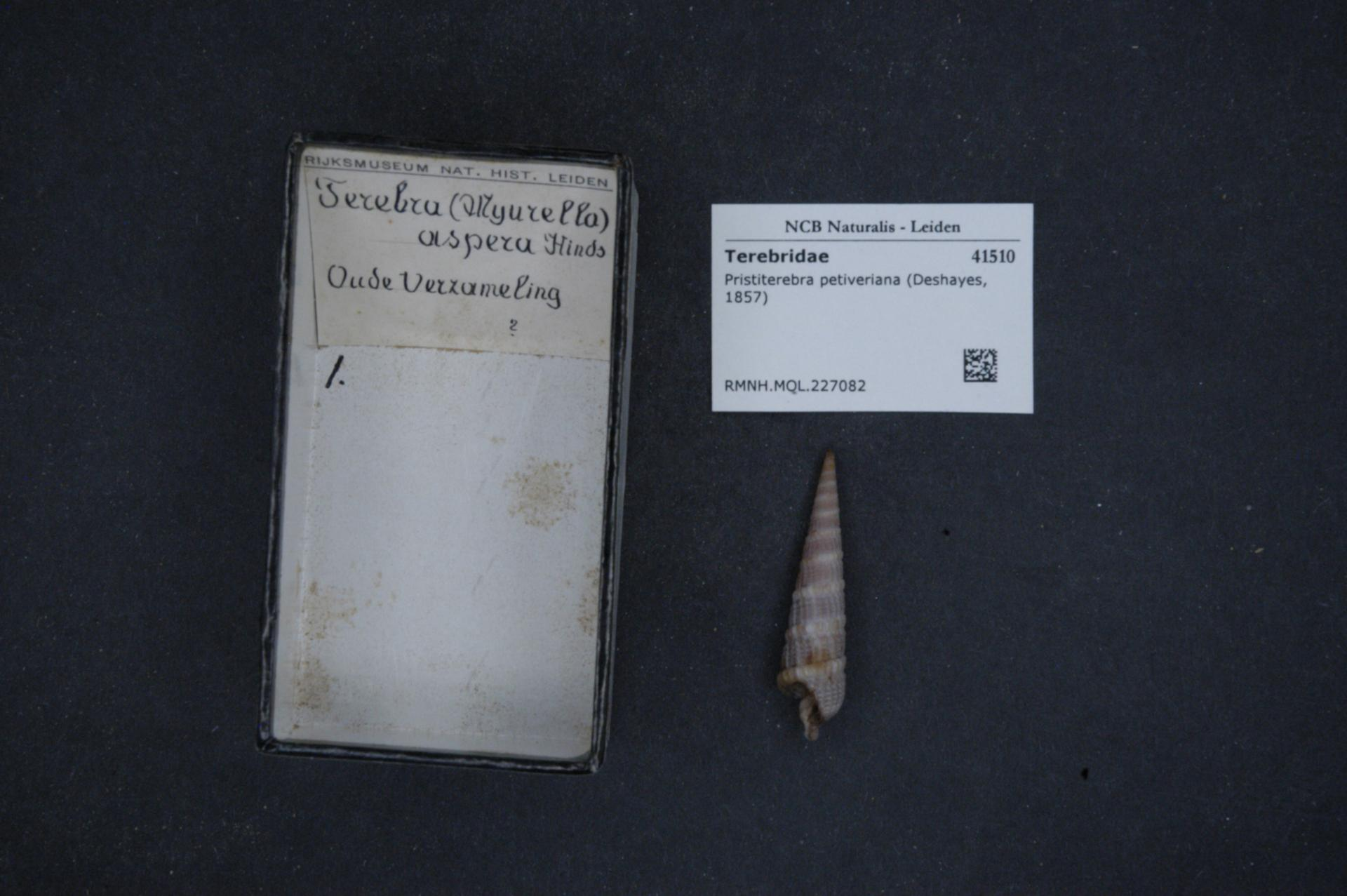
- Pristiterebra petiveriana

Scientific classification
- Kingdom: Animalia
- Phylum: Mollusca
- Class: Gastropoda
- Subclass: Caenogastropoda
- Order: Neogastropoda
- Family: Terebridae
- Genus: Pristiterebra; Taki & Oyama, 1954

Type species
- † Terebra tsuboiana Yokoyama, 1922

Species
- See text.

Synonyms
- Laeviacus Oyama, 1961

= Pristiterebra =

Genus of gastropods

Pristiterebra is a genus of sea snails, marine gastropod mollusks in the family Terebridae, the auger snails.

== Nomenclature ==
The name Pristiterebra is not available (no description, no type species designation) from Taki & Oyama, 1954 (Palaeontological Society of Japan, Special Papers 2: 28). It was given precedence over the simultaneously published Laeviacus by First Reviser's choice by Terryn & Holford, 2009, Visaya, suppl. 3; 46.

== Species ==
Species within the genus Pristiterebra include:

- Pristiterebra bifrons (Hinds, 1844)
- Pristiterebra frausseni Poppe, Tagaro & Terryn, 2009
- Pristiterebra miranda (E.A. Smith, 1873)
- Pristiterebra pustulosa (E.A. Smith, 1879)
- † Pristiterebra tsuboiana (Yokoyama, 1922)
- Pristiterebra tuberculosa (Hinds, 1844)

Species brought into synonymy

- Pristiterebra glauca (Hinds, 1844): synonym of Neoterebra glauca (Hinds, 1844)
- Pristiterebra macleani (Bratcher, 1988): synonym of Partecosta macleani (Bratcher, 1988)
- Pristiterebra milelinae (Aubry, 1999): synonym of Terebra bellanodosa Grabau & S. G. King, 1928
- Pristiterebra petiveriana (Deshayes, 1857): synonym of Neoterebra petiveriana (Deshayes, 1857)
