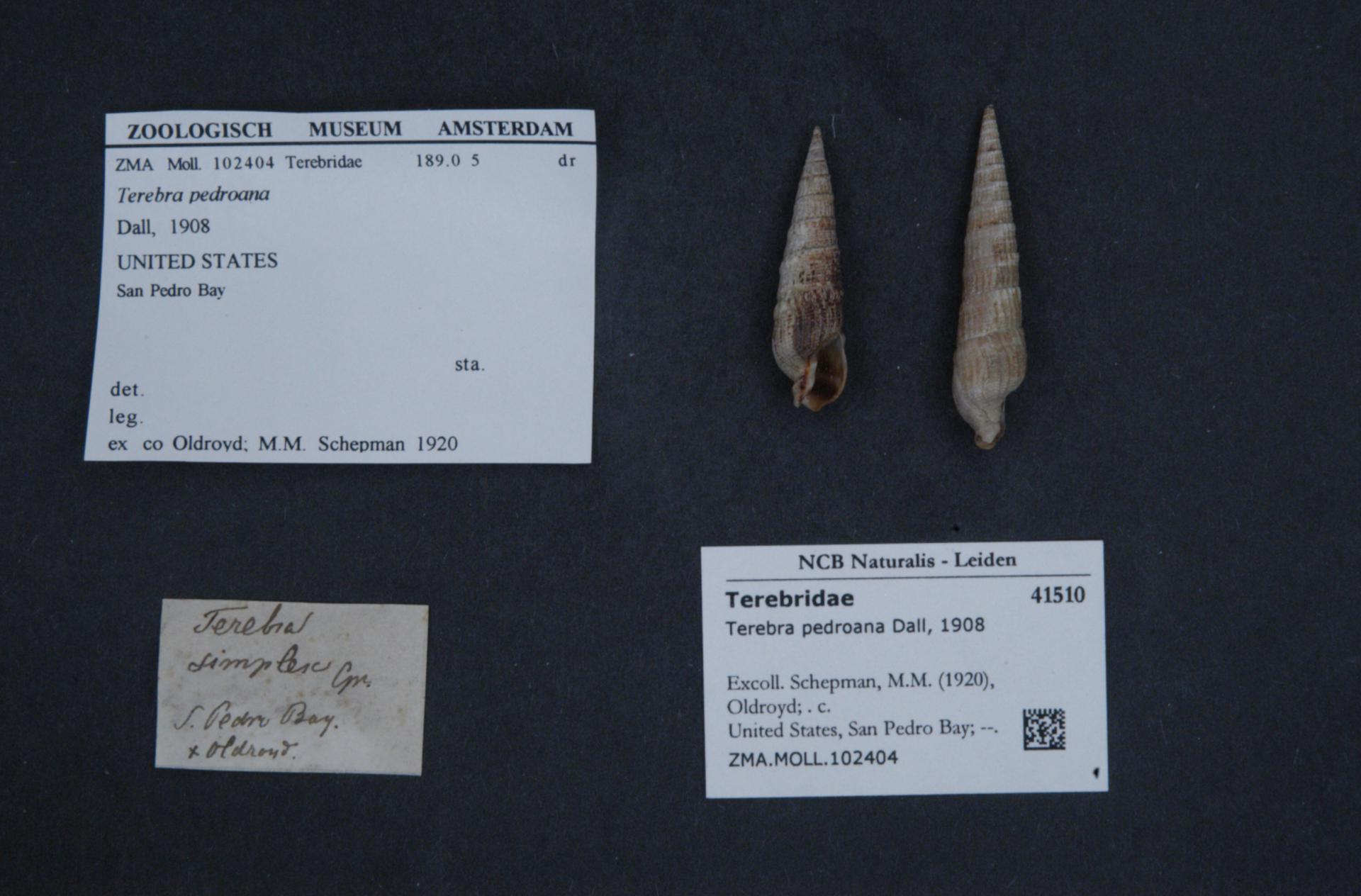

Scientific classification
- Kingdom: Animalia
- Phylum: Mollusca
- Class: Gastropoda
- Subclass: Caenogastropoda
- Order: Neogastropoda
- Family: Terebridae
- Genus: Neoterebra
- Species: N. pedroana

Binomial name
- Neoterebra pedroana Dall, 1908

Synonyms
- Strioterebrum pedroanum; Terebra pedroana Dall, 1908 (original combination)

= Neoterebra pedroana =

Species of gastropod

Neoterebra pedroana, common name the San Pedro auger, is a species of sea snail, a marine gastropod mollusk in the family Terebridae, the auger snails.

The subspecies Terebra pedroana hemphilli Vanatta, 1924 has become a synonym of Neoterebra hemphilli (Vanatta, 1924)

== Description ==
The size of an adult shell varies between 40 mm and 61 mm.

== Distribution ==
This marine species occurs from Santa Monica, California to Southern Baja California, Mexico.
