= T. plicata =

T. plicata may refer to:

- Terebra plicata, a sea snail species
- Thuja plicata, the Western redcedar, an evergreen coniferous tree species native to western North America
- Tiquilia plicata, the fanleaf crinklemat, a perennial, subshrub-like plant species found in the southwestern United States and Northern Mexico

== See also ==
- Plicata (disambiguation)
