= Pristiterebra miranda =

Scientific classification
- Kingdom: Animalia
- Phylum: Mollusca
- Class: Gastropoda
- Subclass: Caenogastropoda
- Order: Neogastropoda
- Family: Terebridae
- Genus: Pristiterebra
- Species: P. miranda

Binomial name
- Pristiterebra miranda (E.A. Smith, 1873)

Synonyms
- Myurella miranda E.A. Smith, 1873; Terebra miranda (E.A. Smith, 1873)

Species of gastropod

Pristiterebra miranda is a species of sea snail, a marine gastropod mollusk in the family Terebridae, the auger snails.
