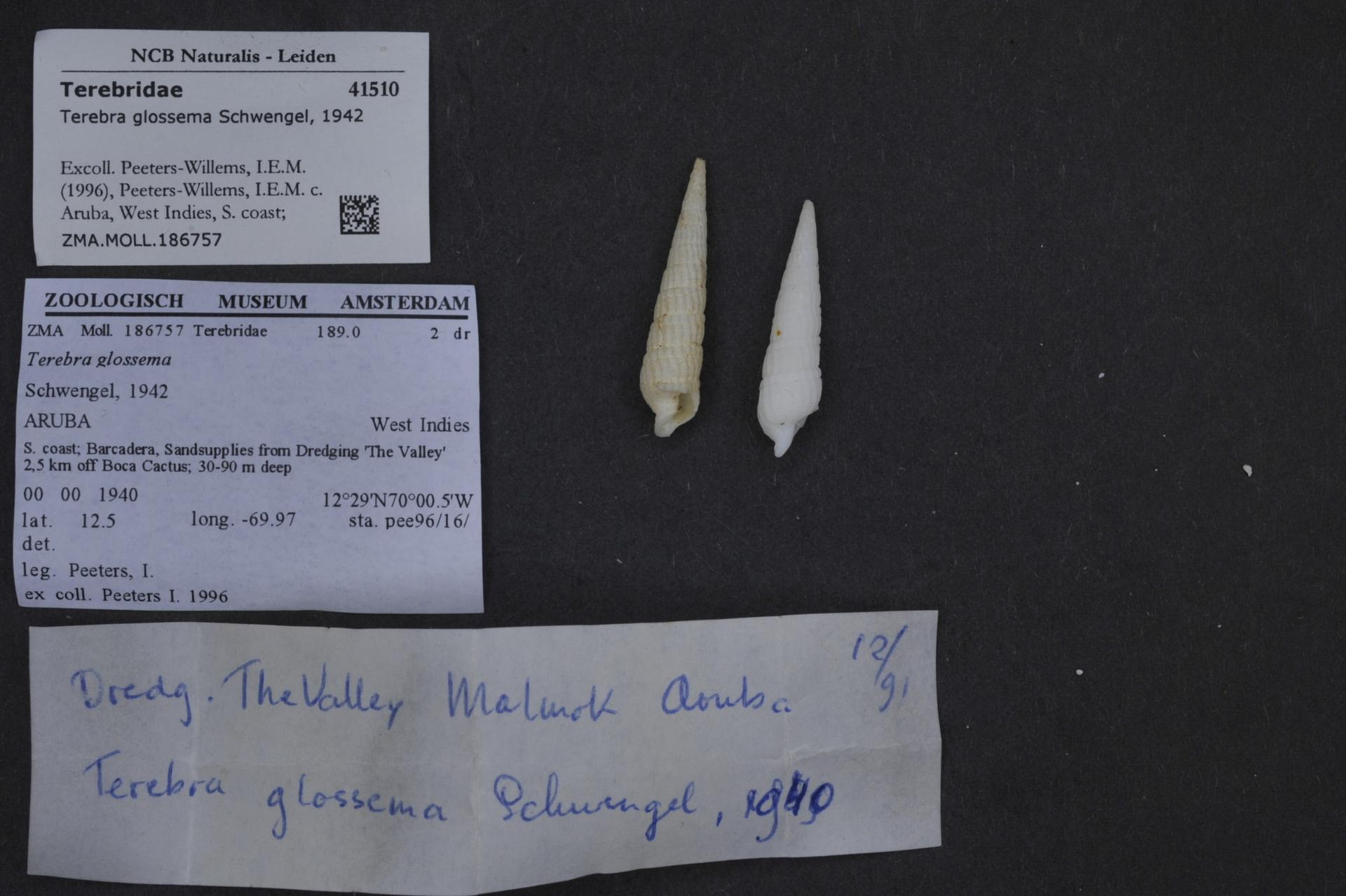

Scientific classification
- Kingdom: Animalia
- Phylum: Mollusca
- Class: Gastropoda
- Subclass: Caenogastropoda
- Order: Neogastropoda
- Family: Terebridae
- Genus: Neoterebra
- Species: N. glossema

Binomial name
- Neoterebra glossema (Schwengel, 1942)

Synonyms
- Terebra glossema Schwengel, 1942 (original combination)

= Neoterebra glossema =

Species of gastropod

Neoterebra glossema, common name the tongue auger, is a species of sea snail, a marine gastropod mollusk in the family Terebridae, the auger snails.
