= Neoterebra shyana =

Scientific classification
- Kingdom: Animalia
- Phylum: Mollusca
- Class: Gastropoda
- Subclass: Caenogastropoda
- Order: Neogastropoda
- Family: Terebridae
- Genus: Neoterebra
- Species: N. shyana

Binomial name
- Neoterebra shyana (Bratcher & Burch, 1970)

Synonyms
- Terebra purdyae Bratcher & Burch, 1970; Terebra shyana Bratcher & R. D. Burch, 1970 (original combination)

Species of gastropod

Neoterebra shyana is a species of sea snail, a marine gastropod mollusk in the family Terebridae, the auger snails.

== Distribution ==
This species occurs in the Pacific Ocean in shallow waters (less than 200m) off the Galapagos Islands.
