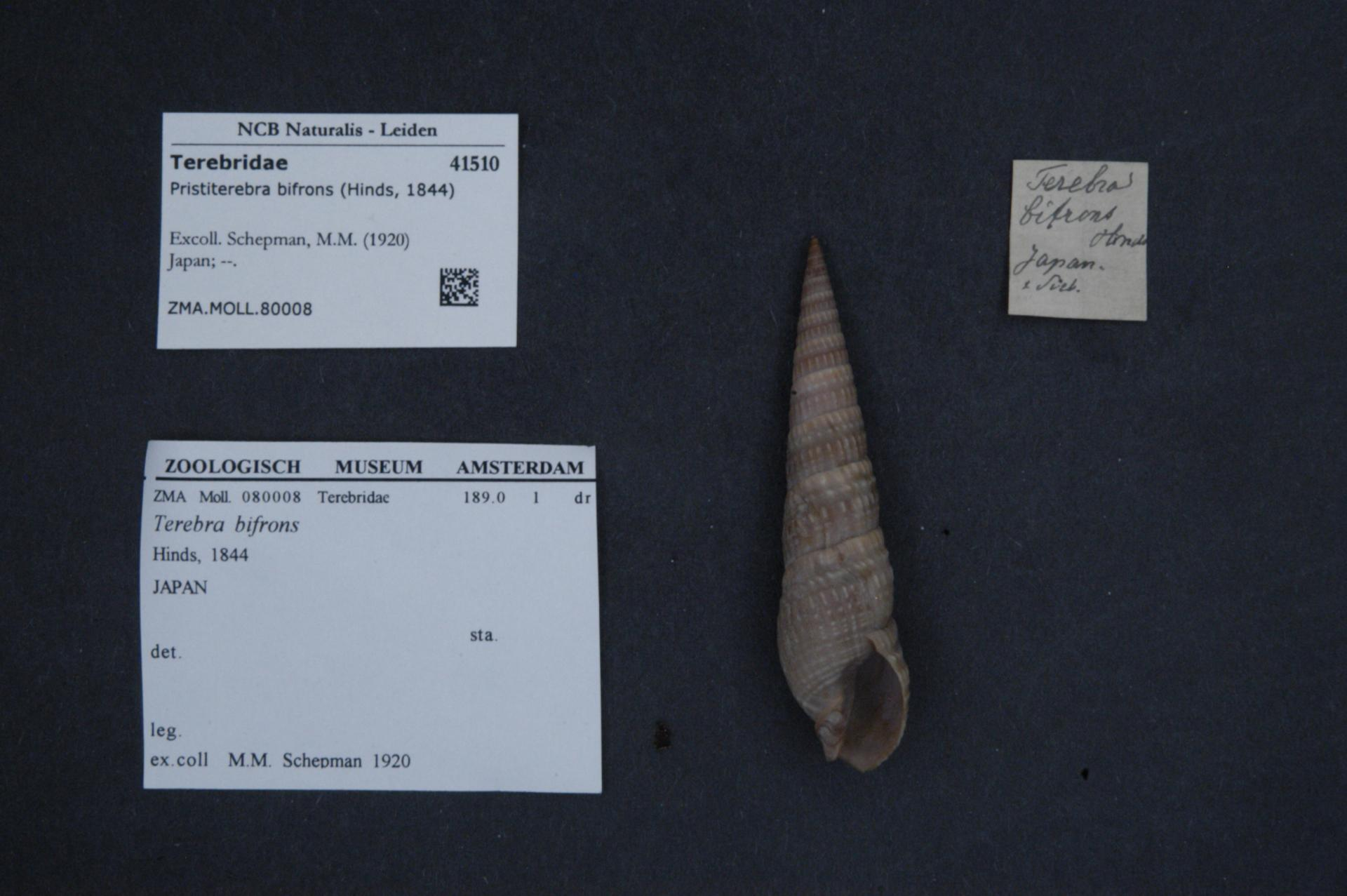

Scientific classification
- Kingdom: Animalia
- Phylum: Mollusca
- Class: Gastropoda
- Subclass: Caenogastropoda
- Order: Neogastropoda
- Family: Terebridae
- Genus: Pristiterebra
- Species: P. bifrons

Binomial name
- Pristiterebra bifrons (Hinds, 1844)

Synonyms
- Noditerebra bifrons (Hinds, 1844); Terebra bifrons Hinds, 1844; Terebra bellanodosa Grabau & King, 1928

= Pristiterebra bifrons =

Species of gastropod

Pristiterebra bifrons is a species of sea snail, a marine gastropod mollusk in the family Terebridae, the auger snails.
