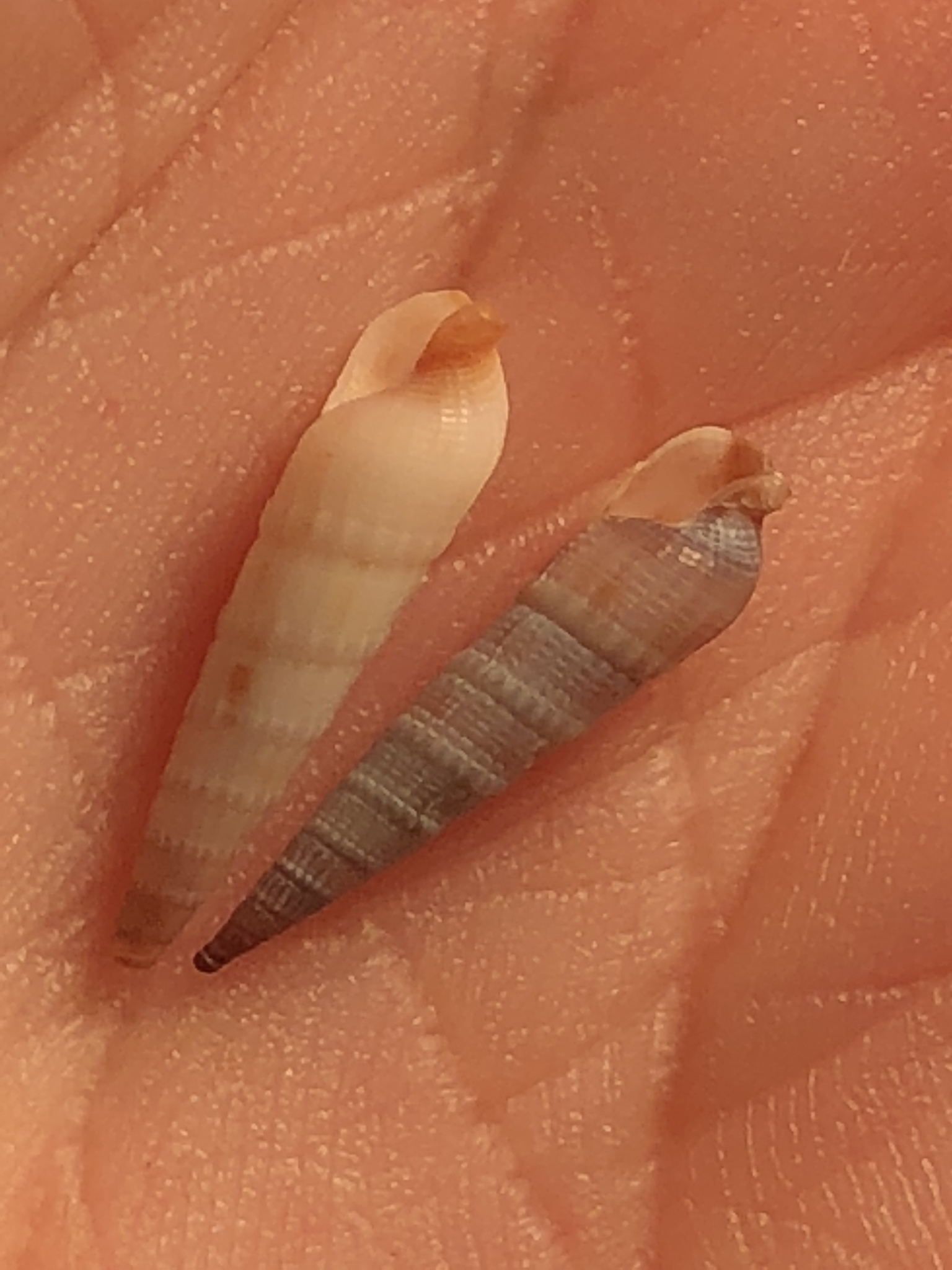

Scientific classification
- Kingdom: Animalia
- Phylum: Mollusca
- Class: Gastropoda
- Subclass: Caenogastropoda
- Order: Neogastropoda
- Family: Terebridae
- Genus: Neoterebra
- Species: N. vinosa

Binomial name
- Neoterebra vinosa (Dall, 1889)

Synonyms
- Acus concavus var. vinosus Dall, 1889; Terebra concava vinosa (Dall, 1889); Terebra vinosa Dall, 1889 (original combination)

= Neoterebra vinosa =

Species of gastropod

Neoterebra vinosa, commonly known as lilac auger, is a species of sea snail, a marine gastropod mollusk in the family Terebridae, the auger snails.
