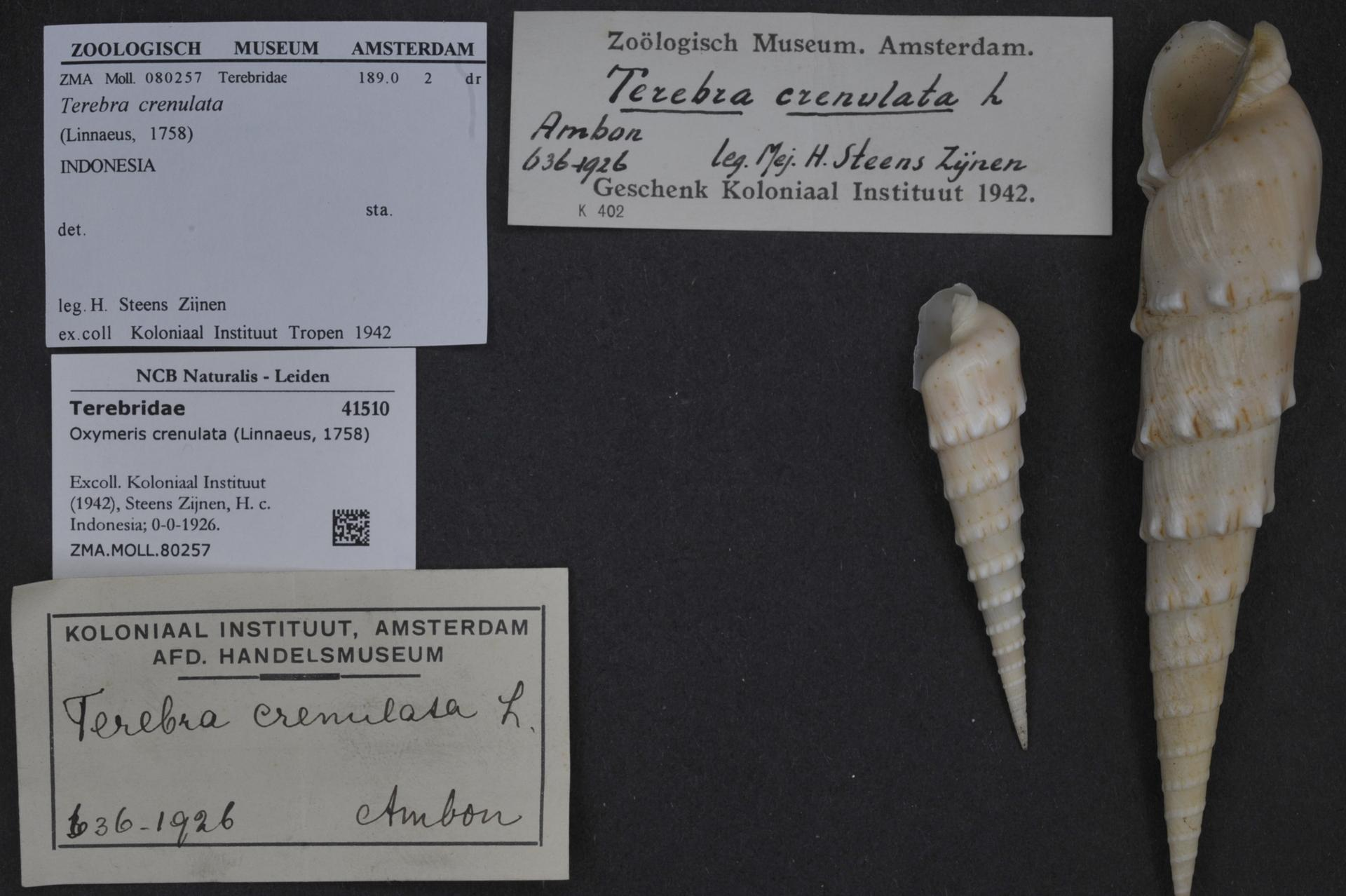

Scientific classification
- Kingdom: Animalia
- Phylum: Mollusca
- Class: Gastropoda
- Subclass: Caenogastropoda
- Order: Neogastropoda
- Family: Terebridae
- Genus: Neoterebra
- Species: N. crenifera

Binomial name
- Neoterebra crenifera (Deshayes, 1859)

Synonyms
- Terebra crenifera Deshayes, 1859 (original combination); Terebra ligyrus Pilsbry & Lowe, 1932

= Neoterebra crenifera =

Species of gastropod

Neoterebra crenifera, common name the western crenate auger, is a species of sea snail, a marine gastropod mollusk in the family Terebridae, the auger snails.
