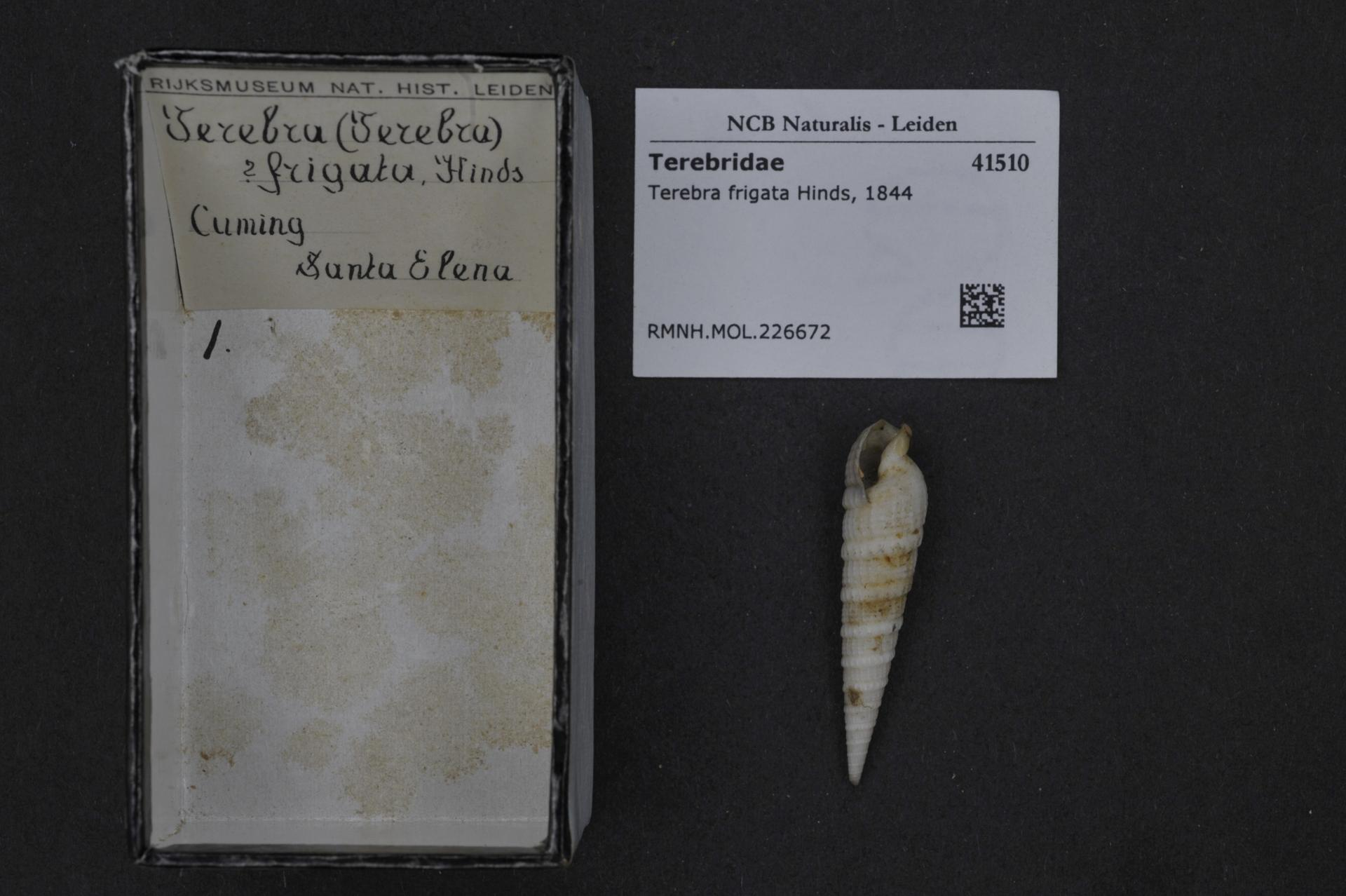
- Terebra frigata Hinds, 1844

Scientific classification
- Kingdom: Animalia
- Phylum: Mollusca
- Class: Gastropoda
- Subclass: Caenogastropoda
- Order: Neogastropoda
- Superfamily: Conoidea
- Family: Terebridae
- Genus: Neoterebra
- Species: N. frigata

Binomial name
- Neoterebra frigata (Hinds, 1844)

Synonyms
- Terebra frigata Hinds, 1844 (original combination)

= Neoterebra frigata =

Species of gastropod

Neoterebra frigata is a species of sea snail, a marine gastropod mollusk in the family Terebridae, the auger snails.
