= Neoterebra bridgesi =

Scientific classification
- Kingdom: Animalia
- Phylum: Mollusca
- Class: Gastropoda
- Subclass: Caenogastropoda
- Order: Neogastropoda
- Family: Terebridae
- Genus: Neoterebra
- Species: N. bridgesi

Binomial name
- Neoterebra bridgesi Dall, 1908

Synonyms
- Terebra bridgesi Dall, 1908 (original combination); Terebra dushanae Campbell, 1964

Species of gastropod

Neoterebra bridgesi is a species of sea snail, a marine gastropod mollusk in the family Terebridae, the auger snails.
