= Neoterebra sanjuanensis =

Scientific classification
- Kingdom: Animalia
- Phylum: Mollusca
- Class: Gastropoda
- Subclass: Caenogastropoda
- Order: Neogastropoda
- Family: Terebridae
- Genus: Neoterebra
- Species: N. sanjuanensis

Binomial name
- Neoterebra sanjuanensis (Pilsbry & Lowe, 1932)

Synonyms
- Strioterebrum sanjuanense (Pilsbry & H. N. Lowe, 1932); Terebra sanjuanensis Pilsbry & Lowe, 1932

Species of gastropod

Neoterebra sanjuanensis is a species of sea snail, a marine gastropod mollusk in the family Terebridae, the auger snails.

== Description ==
The shell of Neoterebra sanjuanensis is relatively heavy with a broad apical angle and reaches a length between 16 mm and 30 mm. It is uniformly yellowish-white in color. The whorls feature a doubled subsutural band that is notably wide, covering approximately 60% to 70% of the whorl's width.

== Distribution ==
This species occurs in the Pacific Ocean off Mexico and Panama.
