= Neoterebra corintoensis =

Scientific classification
- Kingdom: Animalia
- Phylum: Mollusca
- Class: Gastropoda
- Subclass: Caenogastropoda
- Order: Neogastropoda
- Family: Terebridae
- Genus: Neoterebra
- Species: N. corintoensis

Binomial name
- Neoterebra corintoensis (Pilsbry & Lowe, 1932)

Synonyms
- Terebra corintoensis Pilsbry & H. N. Lowe, 1932 (original combination)

Species of gastropod

Neoterebra corintoensis is a species of sea snail, a marine gastropod mollusk in the family Terebridae, the auger snails.
