= Neoterebra biminiensis =

Scientific classification
- Kingdom: Animalia
- Phylum: Mollusca
- Class: Gastropoda
- Subclass: Caenogastropoda
- Order: Neogastropoda
- Superfamily: Conoidea
- Family: Terebridae
- Genus: Neoterebra
- Species: N. biminiensis

Binomial name
- Neoterebra biminiensis (Petuch, 1987)

Synonyms
- Terebra (Strioterebrum) biminiensis Petuch, 1987 (basionym); Terebra biminiensis Petuch, 1987 (original combination)

Species of gastropod

Neoterebra biminiensis is a species of sea snail, a marine gastropod mollusk in the family Terebridae, the auger snails.

== Description ==
Original description: "Shell slender, elongated, with straight-sided whorls; whorls with 21-25 narrow, rounded axial ribs; ribs slightly curved, being bent toward aperture near suture, and straight on main body of whorl; deeply impressed sulcus below suture, producing wide subsutural band; subsutural band intersected by axial ribs, producing beaded effect; body whorl, subsutural band and spire whorls covered by numerous, fine, raised spiral threads; aperture long and narrow, produced anteriorward; shell color uniform pale pinkish tan; interior of aperture rose-pink with tan overtones."

== Etymology ==
"Named for the Bimini Chain of islands, the Bahamas, the type locality."

== Distribution ==
Locus typicus: "Nixon's Harbour, South Bimini Island,
Bimini Chain, Bahamas."

This marine species occurs off the Bahamas.
