= Pristiterebra pustulosa =

Scientific classification
- Kingdom: Animalia
- Phylum: Mollusca
- Class: Gastropoda
- Subclass: Caenogastropoda
- Order: Neogastropoda
- Family: Terebridae
- Genus: Pristiterebra
- Species: P. pustulosa

Binomial name
- Pristiterebra pustulosa (E.A. Smith, 1879)

Synonyms
- Myurella granulosa E.A. Smith, 1873; Terebra pustulosa (E.A. Smith, 1879)

Species of gastropod

Pristiterebra pustulosa is a species of sea snail, a marine gastropod mollusk in the family Terebridae, the auger snails.
