= Neoterebra doellojuradoi =

Scientific classification
- Kingdom: Animalia
- Phylum: Mollusca
- Class: Gastropoda
- Subclass: Caenogastropoda
- Order: Neogastropoda
- Family: Terebridae
- Genus: Neoterebra
- Species: N. doellojuradoi

Binomial name
- Neoterebra doellojuradoi (Carcelles, 1953)

Synonyms
- Terebra doellojuradoi Carcelles, 1953 (original combination)

Species of gastropod

Neoterebra doellojuradoi is a species of sea snail, a marine gastropod mollusk in the family Terebridae, the auger snails.
