= Neoterebra puncturosa =

Scientific classification
- Kingdom: Animalia
- Phylum: Mollusca
- Class: Gastropoda
- Subclass: Caenogastropoda
- Order: Neogastropoda
- Family: Terebridae
- Genus: Neoterebra
- Species: N. puncturosa

Binomial name
- Neoterebra puncturosa (Berry, 1959)

Synonyms
- Euterebra puncturosa (Berry, 1959); Terebra puncturosa S.S. Berry, 1959

Species of gastropod

Neoterebra puncturosa is a species of sea snail, a marine gastropod mollusk in the family Terebridae, the auger snails.
