= Neoterebra churea =

Scientific classification
- Kingdom: Animalia
- Phylum: Mollusca
- Class: Gastropoda
- Subclass: Caenogastropoda
- Order: Neogastropoda
- Family: Terebridae
- Genus: Neoterebra
- Species: N. churea

Binomial name
- Neoterebra churea (Campbell, 1964)

Synonyms
- Terebra churea G. B. Campbell, 1964 (original combination)

Species of gastropod

Neoterebra churea is a species of sea snail, a marine gastropod mollusk in the family Terebridae, the auger snails.
