= Neoterebra roperi =

Scientific classification
- Kingdom: Animalia
- Phylum: Mollusca
- Class: Gastropoda
- Subclass: Caenogastropoda
- Order: Neogastropoda
- Family: Terebridae
- Genus: Neoterebra
- Species: N. roperi

Binomial name
- Neoterebra roperi (Pilsbry & Lowe, 1932)

Synonyms
- Terebra adairensis Campbell, 1964; Terebra roperi Pilsbry & H. N. Lowe, 1932 (original combination)

Species of gastropod

Neoterebra roperi is a species of sea snail, a marine gastropod mollusk in the family Terebridae, the auger snails.
