= Neoterebra berryi =

Scientific classification
- Kingdom: Animalia
- Phylum: Mollusca
- Class: Gastropoda
- Subclass: Caenogastropoda
- Order: Neogastropoda
- Superfamily: Conoidea
- Family: Terebridae
- Genus: Neoterebra
- Species: N. berryi

Binomial name
- Neoterebra berryi (G.B. Campbell, 1961

Synonyms
- Terebra berryi G.B. Campbell, 1961

Species of gastropod

Neoterebra berryi is a species of sea snail, a marine gastropod mollusk in the family Terebridae, the auger snails.
