= Neoterebra brasiliensis =

Scientific classification
- Kingdom: Animalia
- Phylum: Mollusca
- Class: Gastropoda
- Subclass: Caenogastropoda
- Order: Neogastropoda
- Family: Terebridae
- Genus: Neoterebra
- Species: N. brasiliensis

Binomial name
- Neoterebra brasiliensis (Smith, 1873)

Synonyms
- Abretia brasiliensis Smith, 1873; Terebra brasiliensis (E. A. Smith, 1873)

Species of gastropod

Neoterebra brasiliensis is a species of sea snail, a marine gastropod mollusk in the family Terebridae, the auger snails.
