= Neoterebra elata =

Scientific classification
- Kingdom: Animalia
- Phylum: Mollusca
- Class: Gastropoda
- Subclass: Caenogastropoda
- Order: Neogastropoda
- Family: Terebridae
- Genus: Neoterebra
- Species: N. elata

Binomial name
- Neoterebra elata (Hinds, 1844)

Synonyms
- Terebra elata Hinds, 1844 (original combination); Terebra montijoensis Pilsbry & Lowe, 1932

Species of gastropod

Neoterebra elata is a species of sea snail, a marine gastropod mollusk in the family Terebridae, the auger snails.
