= Neoterebra panamensis =

Scientific classification
- Kingdom: Animalia
- Phylum: Mollusca
- Class: Gastropoda
- Subclass: Caenogastropoda
- Order: Neogastropoda
- Family: Terebridae
- Genus: Neoterebra
- Species: N. panamensis

Binomial name
- Neoterebra panamensis (Dall, 1908)

Synonyms
- Terebra panamensis Dall, 1908 (original combination)

Species of gastropod

Neoterebra panamensis is a species of sea snail, a marine gastropod mollusk in the family Terebridae, the auger snails.
