= Neoterebra juanica =

Scientific classification
- Kingdom: Animalia
- Phylum: Mollusca
- Class: Gastropoda
- Subclass: Caenogastropoda
- Order: Neogastropoda
- Family: Terebridae
- Genus: Neoterebra
- Species: N. juanica

Binomial name
- Neoterebra juanica (Dall & Simpson, 1901)

Synonyms
- Terebra juanica Dall & Simpson, 1901 (original combination)

Species of gastropod

Neoterebra juanica is a species of sea snail, a marine gastropod mollusk in the family Terebridae, the auger snails.

== Distribution ==
This marine species occurs off Puerto Rico
