= Neoterebra nassula =

Scientific classification
- Kingdom: Animalia
- Phylum: Mollusca
- Class: Gastropoda
- Subclass: Caenogastropoda
- Order: Neogastropoda
- Family: Terebridae
- Genus: Neoterebra
- Species: N. nassula

Binomial name
- Neoterebra nassula (Dall, 1889)

Synonyms
- Terebra nassula Dall, 1889 (original combination)

Species of gastropod

Neoterebra nassula is a species of sea snail, a marine gastropod mollusk in the family Terebridae, the auger snails.
