= Neoterebra tiarella =

Scientific classification
- Kingdom: Animalia
- Phylum: Mollusca
- Class: Gastropoda
- Subclass: Caenogastropoda
- Order: Neogastropoda
- Family: Terebridae
- Genus: Neoterebra
- Species: N. tiarella

Binomial name
- Neoterebra tiarella (Deshayes, 1857)

Synonyms
- Terebra fitchi Berry, 1958; Terebra tiarella Deshayes, 1857 (original combination)

Species of gastropod

Neoterebra tiarella is a species of sea snail, a marine gastropod mollusk in the family Terebridae, the auger snails.
