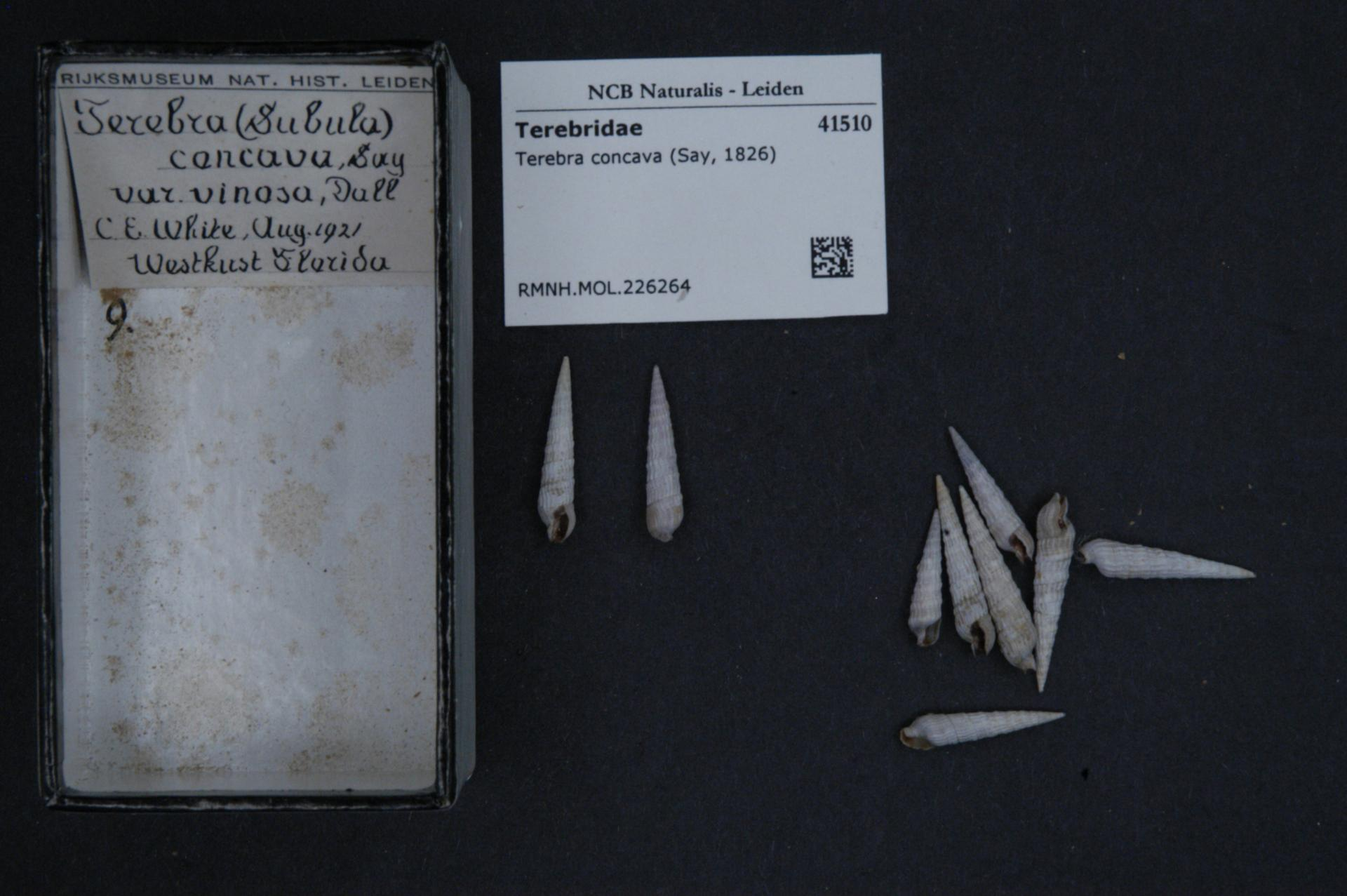

Scientific classification
- Kingdom: Animalia
- Phylum: Mollusca
- Class: Gastropoda
- Subclass: Caenogastropoda
- Order: Neogastropoda
- Superfamily: Conoidea
- Family: Terebridae
- Genus: Neoterebra
- Species: N. concava

Binomial name
- Neoterebra concava (Say, 1826)

Synonyms
- Acus concavus (Say, 1826); Terebra concava (Say, 1826); Turritella concava Say, 1826

= Neoterebra concava =

Species of gastropod

Neoterebra concava is a species of sea snail, a marine gastropod mollusk in the family Terebridae, the auger snails.
