= Neoterebra arcas =

Scientific classification
- Kingdom: Animalia
- Phylum: Mollusca
- Class: Gastropoda
- Subclass: Caenogastropoda
- Order: Neogastropoda
- Superfamily: Conoidea
- Family: Terebridae
- Genus: Neoterebra
- Species: N. arcas

Binomial name
- Neoterebra arcas (Abbott, 1954)

Synonyms
- Terebra arcas Abbott, 1954 (original combination)

Species of gastropod

Neoterebra arcas is a species of sea snail, a marine gastropod mollusk in the family Terebridae, the auger snails.
