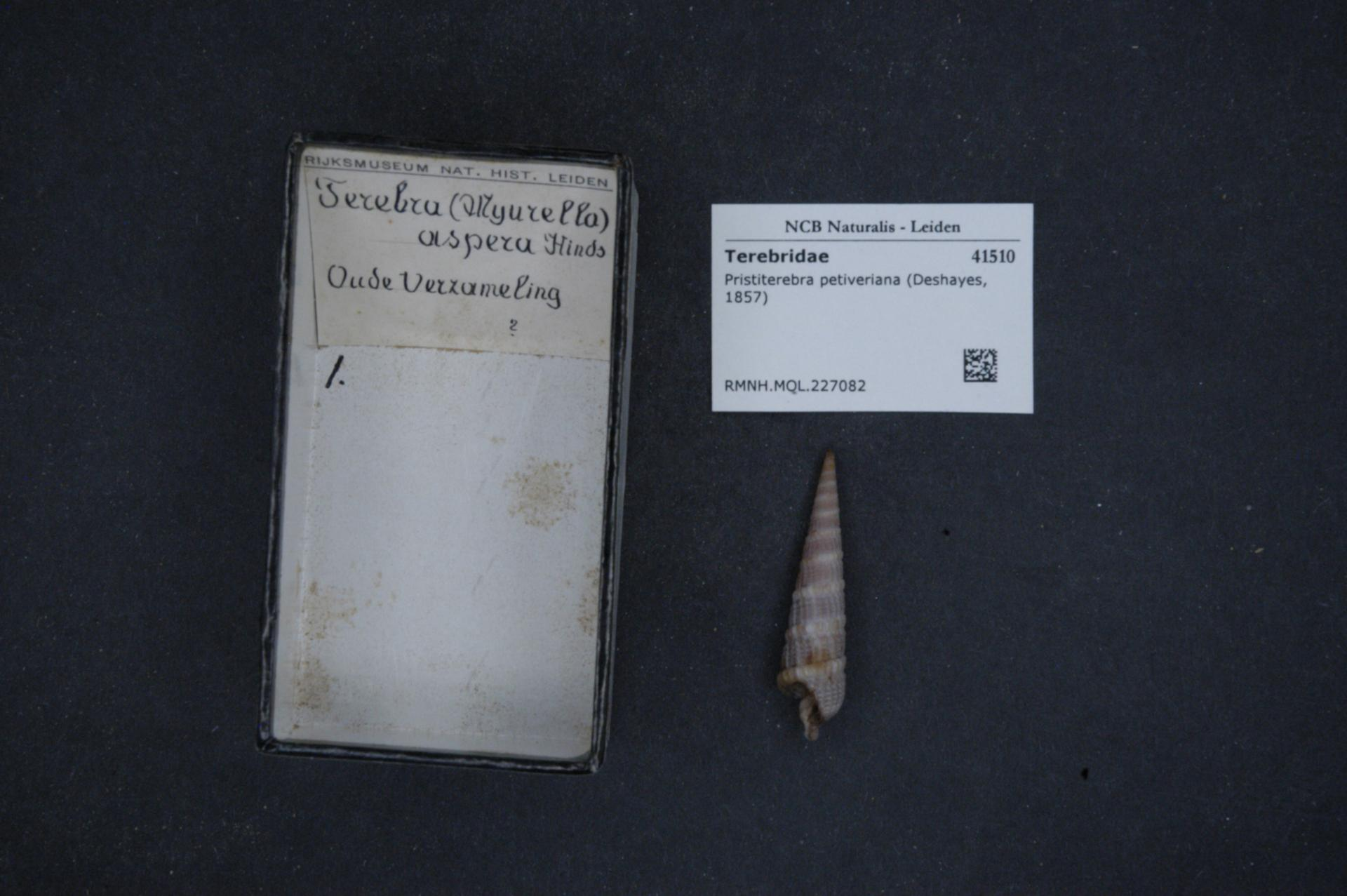
- Pristiterebra petiveriana (Deshayes, 1857)

Scientific classification
- Kingdom: Animalia
- Phylum: Mollusca
- Class: Gastropoda
- Subclass: Caenogastropoda
- Order: Neogastropoda
- Superfamily: Conoidea
- Family: Terebridae
- Genus: Neoterebra
- Species: N. petiveriana

Binomial name
- Neoterebra petiveriana (Deshayes, 1857)

Synonyms
- Pristiterebra petiveriana (Deshayes, 1857); Terebra aspera Hinds, 1844; Terebra petiveriana Deshayes, 1857

= Neoterebra petiveriana =

Species of gastropod

Neoterebra petiveriana is a species of sea snail, a marine gastropod mollusk in the family Terebridae, the auger snails.

== Distribution ==
Neoterebra petiveriana can be found within the Caribbean Sea, as well as some areas of Colombia.
