= Neoterebra incisa =

Scientific classification
- Kingdom: Animalia
- Phylum: Mollusca
- Class: Gastropoda
- Subclass: Caenogastropoda
- Order: Neogastropoda
- Family: Terebridae
- Genus: Neoterebra
- Species: N. incisa

Binomial name
- Neoterebra incisa (Faber, 2007)

Synonyms
- Terebra incisa Faber, 2007

Species of gastropod

Neoterebra incisa is a species of sea snail, a marine gastropod mollusk in the family Terebridae, the auger snails.
