= Neoterebra mugridgeae =

Scientific classification
- Kingdom: Animalia
- Phylum: Mollusca
- Class: Gastropoda
- Subclass: Caenogastropoda
- Order: Neogastropoda
- Family: Terebridae
- Genus: Neoterebra
- Species: N. mugridgeae

Binomial name
- Neoterebra mugridgeae (E. F. García, 1999)

Synonyms
- Terebra mugridgeae E. F. García, 1999 (original combination)

Species of gastropod

Neoterebra mugridgeae is a species of sea snail, a marine gastropod mollusk in the family Terebridae, the auger snails.
