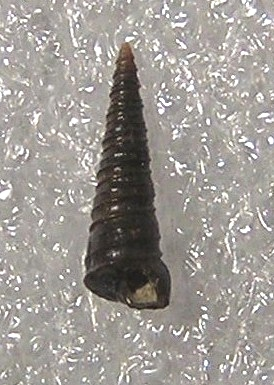

Scientific classification
- Kingdom: Animalia
- Phylum: Mollusca
- Class: Gastropoda
- Subclass: Caenogastropoda
- Order: Neogastropoda
- Family: Terebridae
- Genus: Neoterebra
- Species: N. protexta

Binomial name
- Neoterebra protexta (Conrad, 1846)

Synonyms
- Acus protextus lutescens (f) Dall, 1889; Cerithium protextum Conrad, 1846 (original combination); Terebra protexta (Conrad, 1846)

= Neoterebra protexta =

Species of gastropod

Neoterebra protexta, common name the fine-ribbed auger, is a species of sea snail, a marine gastropod mollusc in the family Terebridae, the auger snails.

== Description ==
The length of shell varies between 16 mm and 28 mm.

== Distribution ==
This marine species occurs in the Atlantic Ocean from North Carolina, USA to Brazil; in the Caribbean Sea and the Gulf of Mexico.
