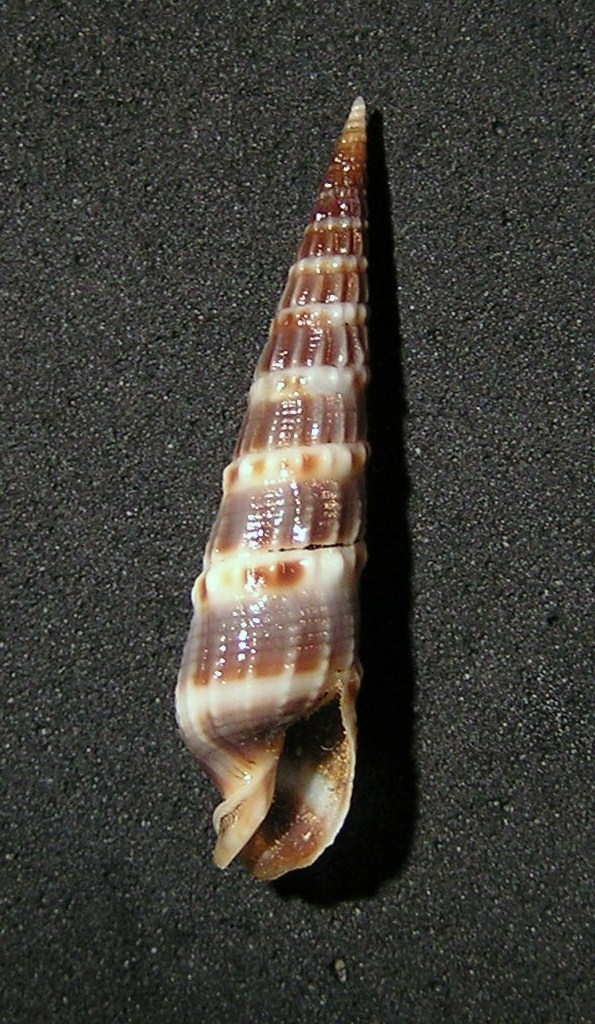
- Apertural view of a shell of Neoterebra variegata

Scientific classification
- Kingdom: Animalia
- Phylum: Mollusca
- Class: Gastropoda
- Subclass: Caenogastropoda
- Order: Neogastropoda
- Family: Terebridae
- Genus: Neoterebra
- Species: N. variegata

Binomial name
- Neoterebra variegata (Gray, 1834)

Synonyms
- Strioterebrum melia Pilsbry & H.N. Lowe, 1931; Terebra africana Gray in Griffith & Pidgeon; Terebra hupei Lorois, 1857; Terebra melia Pilsbry, 1931; Terebra variegata Gray (original combination)

= Neoterebra variegata =

Species of gastropod

Neoterebra variegata, common name the variegated auger, is a species of sea snail, a marine gastropod mollusk in the family Terebridae, the auger snails.

== Description ==
The length of the shell varies between 25 mm and 100 mm.

== Distribution ==
This species occurs in the Pacific Ocean from Baja California peninsula to Peru; off Galápagos Islands.
