= Neoterebra intumescyra =

Scientific classification
- Kingdom: Animalia
- Phylum: Mollusca
- Class: Gastropoda
- Subclass: Caenogastropoda
- Order: Neogastropoda
- Family: Terebridae
- Genus: Neoterebra
- Species: N. intumescyra

Binomial name
- Neoterebra intumescyra (S. Lima, Tenorio & de Barros, 2007)

Synonyms
- Terebra intemnuscyra [sic] (misspelling); Terebra intumescyra S. Lima, Tenorio & de Barros, 2007 (original combination)

Species of gastropod

Neoterebra intumescyra is a species of sea snail, a marine gastropod mollusk in the family Terebridae, the auger snails.
