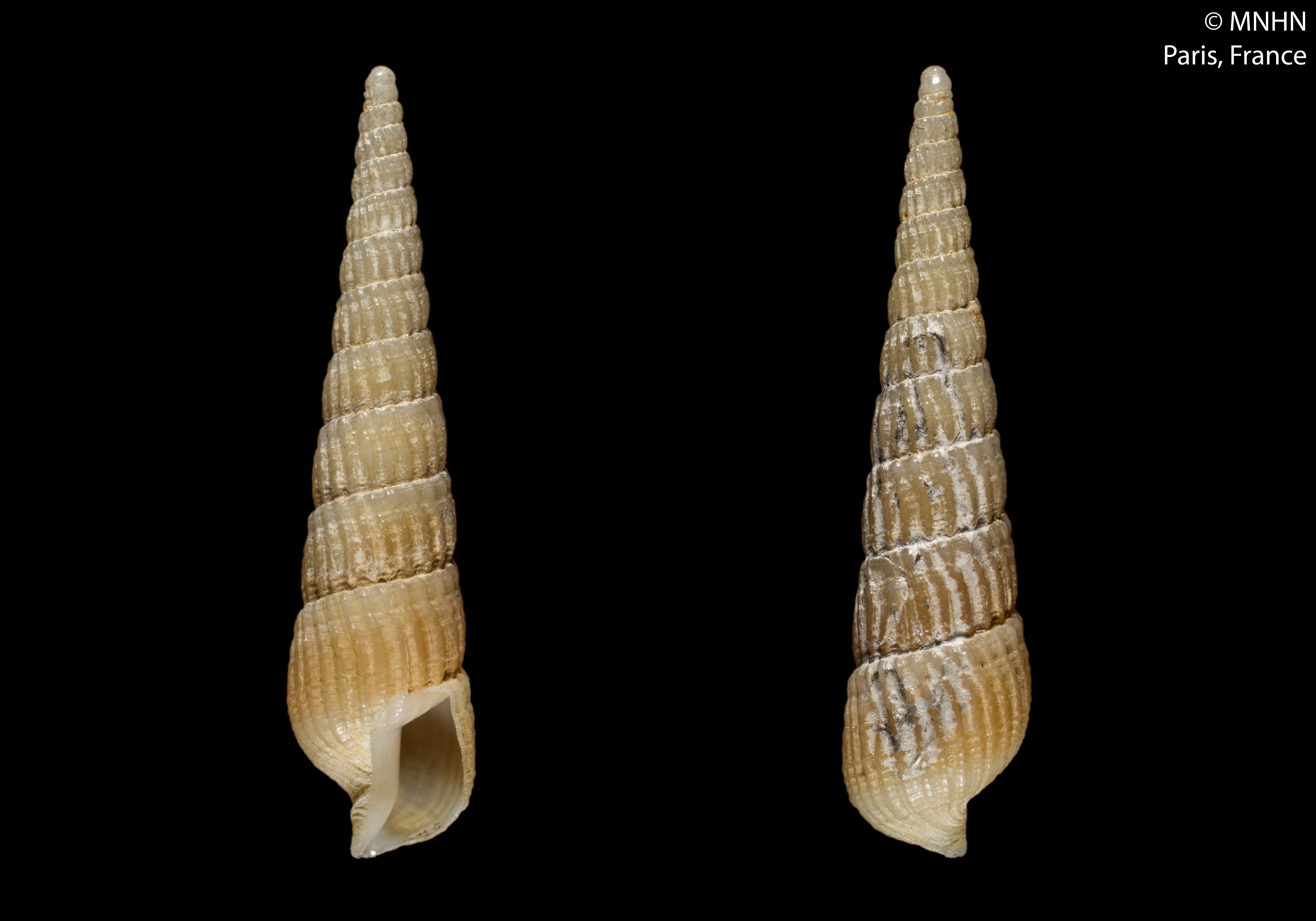
- Shell of Neoterebra sterigma (holotype at MNHN, Paris)

Scientific classification
- Kingdom: Animalia
- Phylum: Mollusca
- Class: Gastropoda
- Subclass: Caenogastropoda
- Order: Neogastropoda
- Family: Terebridae
- Genus: Neoterebra
- Species: N. sterigma

Binomial name
- Neoterebra sterigma (Simone, 1999)

Synonyms
- Terebra sterigma Simone, 1999 (original combination)

= Neoterebra sterigma =

Species of gastropod

Neoterebra sterigma is a species of sea snail, a marine gastropod mollusk in the family Terebridae, the auger snails.

Neoterebra sterigma is a typical species of deep-sea benthic snails in the western Atlantic Ocean. Its distinguishing features are fine shell carvings and wide apex angles, which are significantly different from shallow-sea species of the same genus (such as N. guadeloupensis).

== Classification ==
Neoterebra sterigma (Simone, 1999) belongs to the superfamily Conoidea, family Terebridae, and genus Neoterebra. It is currently only recorded in the Brazilian waters of the western Atlantic Ocean, with a habitat depth of 340–360 meters. It is a typical deep-sea aquatic species.

== Morphological Characteristics ==
=== Shell type ===
Small snail, shell length 16.4-24.2 mm (including paratype), with a wide and fat outline, convex whorls, and a wide apex angle (compared with the closely related species N. pruvosti).

=== Shell surface carving ===
Axial ribs and spiral carvings: Axial ribs are fine and closely spaced (about 3 times the rib width), and the spiral carvings are dense and deep, cutting the top of the axial ribs to form a grid-like structure (different from the wide spacing and coarse carvings of N. pruvosti).

Suture zone: With white sub-suture zone, deep indentations on the edge, and rectangular pits formed by the axial ribs inside the zone.

Color: The shell color of living organisms is light yellow to pinkish white, and the sub-suture zone is white (the type specimen may fade to pure white because it was collected as a dead shell).

Protoshell: 1.5-2.0 whorls, spherical core, and unclear transition from the body.

== Description ==
The length of the shell attains 11.9 mm.

== Distribution ==
This species occurs in the Atlantic Ocean off Southeast Brazil.
