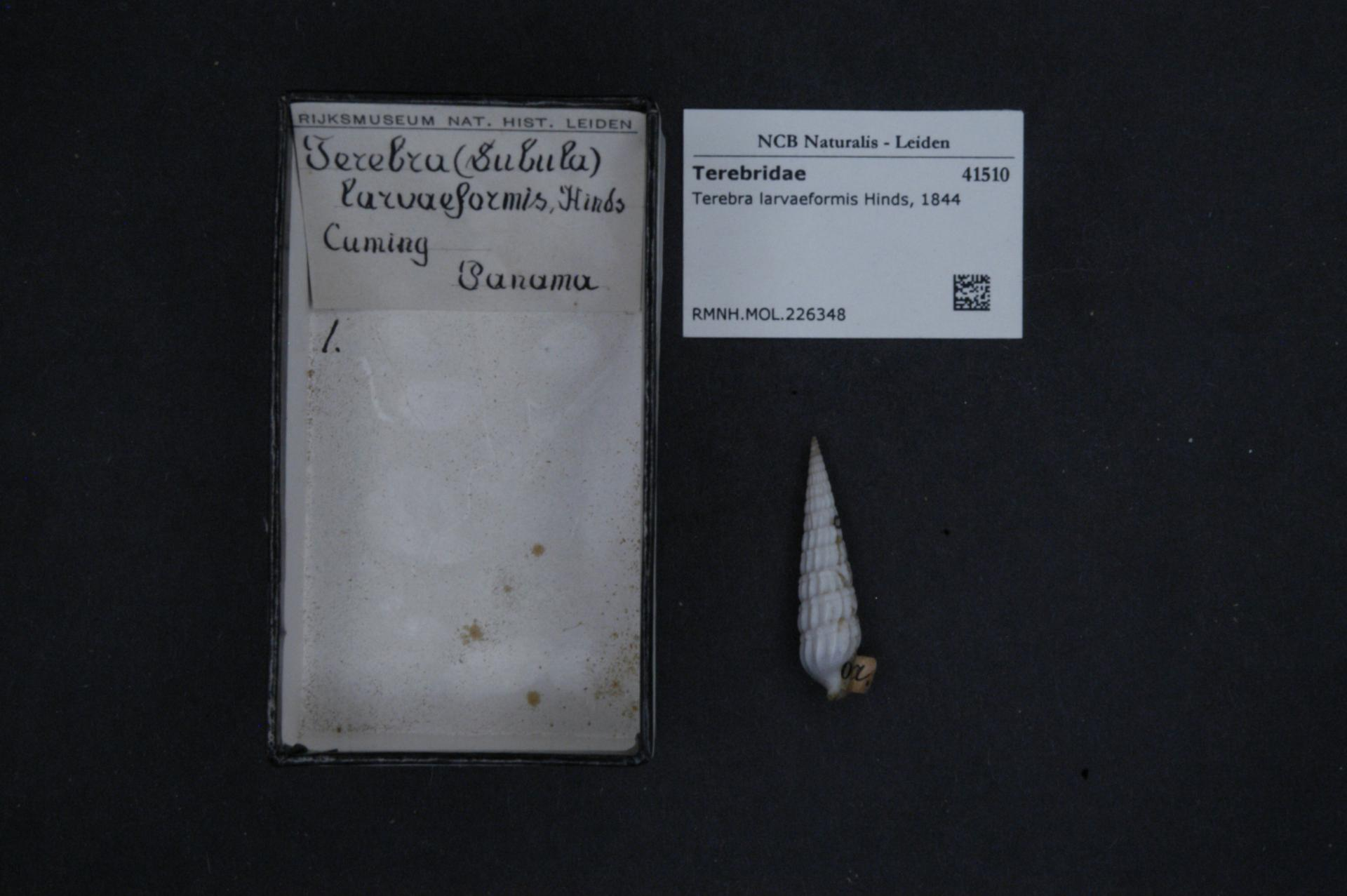
- Shell of Neoterebra larvaeformis

Scientific classification
- Kingdom: Animalia
- Phylum: Mollusca
- Class: Gastropoda
- Subclass: Caenogastropoda
- Order: Neogastropoda
- Family: Terebridae
- Genus: Neoterebra
- Species: N. larvaeformis

Binomial name
- Neoterebra larvaeformis (Hinds, 1844)

Synonyms
- Terebra brunneocincta Pilsbry & Lowe, 1932; Terebra isopleura Pilsbry & Lowe, 1932; Terebra larvaeformis Hinds, 1844 (original combination); Terebra varicosa Hinds, 1844

= Neoterebra larvaeformis =

Species of gastropod

Neoterebra larvaeformis is a species of sea snail, a marine gastropod mollusk in the family Terebridae, the auger snails.
