= Neoterebra riosi =

Scientific classification
- Kingdom: Animalia
- Phylum: Mollusca
- Class: Gastropoda
- Subclass: Caenogastropoda
- Order: Neogastropoda
- Family: Terebridae
- Genus: Neoterebra
- Species: N. riosi

Binomial name
- Neoterebra riosi (Bratcher & Cernohorsky, 1985)

Synonyms
- Euterebra riosi (Bratcher & Cernohorsky, 1985); Terebra riosi Bratcher & Cernohorsky, 1985

Species of gastropod

Neoterebra riosi is a species of sea snail, a marine gastropod mollusk in the family Terebridae, the auger snails.
