= Neoterebra alba =

Scientific classification
- Kingdom: Animalia
- Phylum: Mollusca
- Class: Gastropoda
- Subclass: Caenogastropoda
- Order: Neogastropoda
- Superfamily: Conoidea
- Family: Terebridae
- Genus: Neoterebra
- Species: N. alba

Binomial name
- Neoterebra alba (Gray, 1834)

Synonyms
- Terebra alba Gray, 1834 (original combination)

Species of gastropod

Neoterebra alba is a species of sea snail, a marine gastropod mollusk in the family Terebridae, the auger snails.
