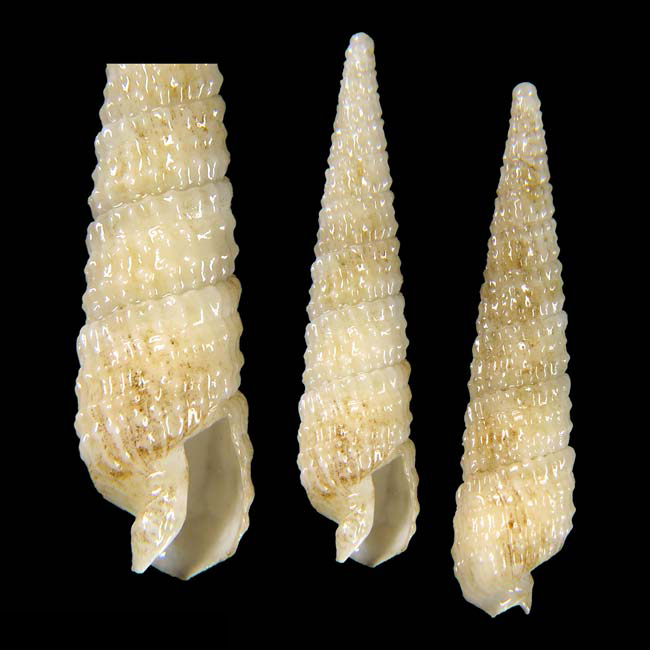

Scientific classification
- Kingdom: Animalia
- Phylum: Mollusca
- Class: Gastropoda
- Subclass: Caenogastropoda
- Order: Neogastropoda
- Family: Terebridae
- Genus: Pristiterebra
- Species: P. frausseni

Binomial name
- Pristiterebra frausseni Poppe, Tagaro & Terryn, 2009

= Pristiterebra frausseni =

Species of gastropod

Pristiterebra frausseni is a species of sea snail, a marine gastropod mollusk in the family Terebridae, the auger snails.
