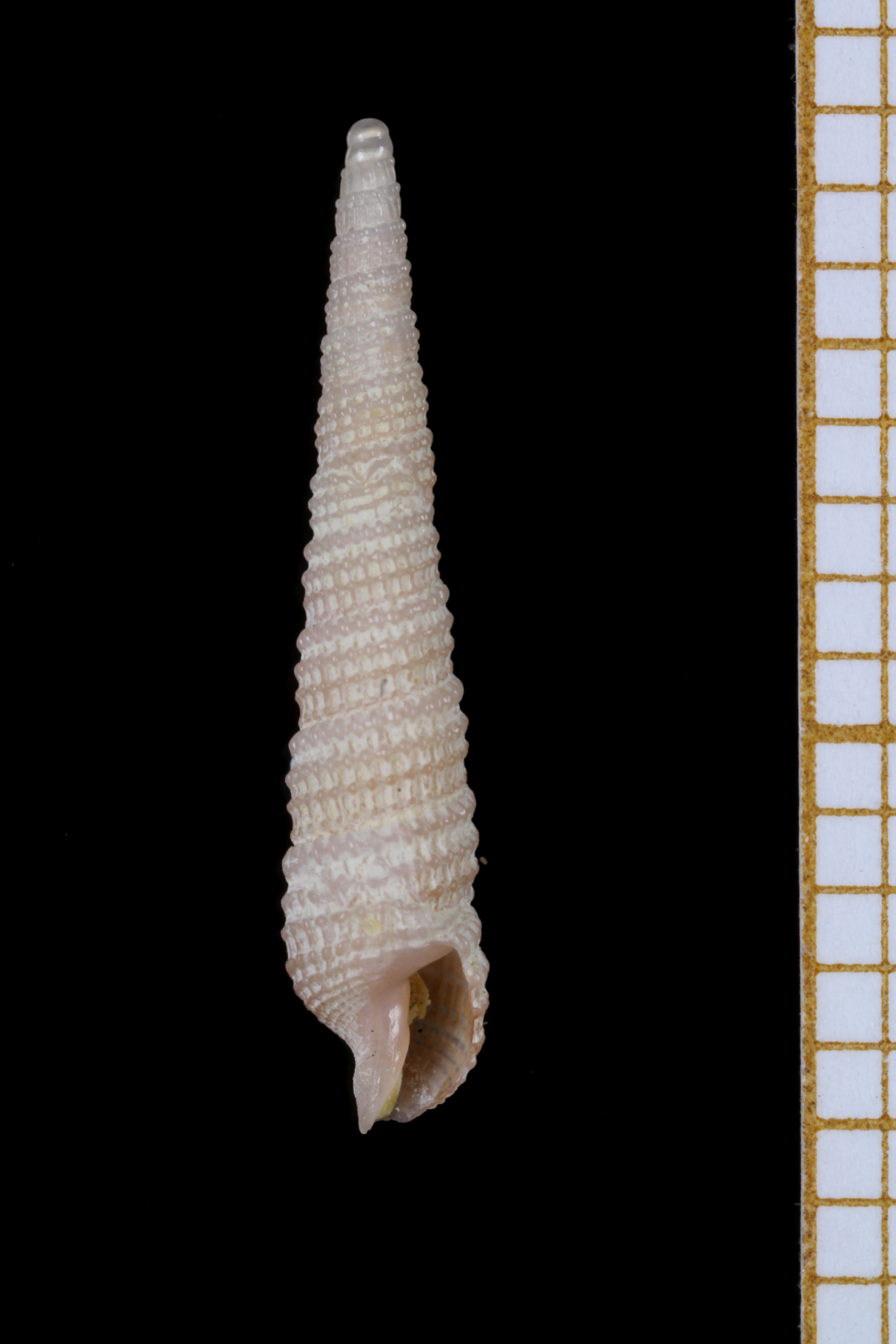

Scientific classification
- Kingdom: Animalia
- Phylum: Mollusca
- Class: Gastropoda
- Subclass: Caenogastropoda
- Order: Neogastropoda
- Family: Terebridae
- Genus: Neoterebra
- Species: N. limatula

Binomial name
- Neoterebra limatula (Dall, 1889)

Synonyms
- Terebra limatula Dall, 1889 (original combination)

= Neoterebra limatula =

Species of gastropod

Neoterebra limatula is a species of sea snail, a marine gastropod mollusk in the family Terebridae, the auger snails.

== Distribution ==
This marine species occurs off Guadeloupe.
