= Pristiterebra tuberculosa =

Scientific classification
- Kingdom: Animalia
- Phylum: Mollusca
- Class: Gastropoda
- Subclass: Caenogastropoda
- Order: Neogastropoda
- Family: Terebridae
- Genus: Pristiterebra
- Species: P. tuberculosa

Binomial name
- Pristiterebra tuberculosa (Hinds, 1844)

Synonyms
- † Terebra cracilenta Li, 1930; † Terebra tenuis Li, 1930; Terebra tuberculosa Hinds, 1844

Species of gastropod

Pristiterebra tuberculosa, common name : the tuberculate auger, is a species of sea snail, a marine gastropod mollusk in the family Terebridae, the auger snails.

== Description ==
The size of an adult shell varies between 30 mm and 73 mm.

== Distribution ==
This species is distributed in the Pacific Ocean from Mexico to Ecuador.
