= Neoterebra pacei =

Scientific classification
- Kingdom: Animalia
- Phylum: Mollusca
- Class: Gastropoda
- Subclass: Caenogastropoda
- Order: Neogastropoda
- Family: Terebridae
- Genus: Neoterebra
- Species: N. pacei

Binomial name
- Neoterebra pacei (Petuch, 1987)

Synonyms
- Terebra pacei Petuch, 1987 (original combination)

Species of gastropod

Neoterebra pacei is a species of sea snail, a marine gastropod mollusk in the family Terebridae, the auger snails.

== Description ==
Original description: "Shell elongated, with distinctly concave whorls; last whorl elongated, with rounded and tapered base; aperture elongated; whorls ornamented with 21-24 large, evenly-spaced axial ribs; subsutural band well-developed, projecting beyond outline of shell, producing concave appearance to whorls; axial ribs extend onto subsutural band, producing evenly-spaced, oval-shaped beads; axial ribs overlaid with numerous large, raised spiral threads; subsutural smooth, without threads; shell color pale lilac purple with scattered, large reddish-brown axial flames; base of shell darker purple; columella and siphonal canal brown; protoconch and early whorls dark purple-brown; interior of aperture white."

== Distribution ==
Locus typicus: "Nixon's Harbour, South Bimini Island, Bimini Chain, Bahamas."
