= Neoterebra acrior =

Scientific classification
- Kingdom: Animalia
- Phylum: Mollusca
- Class: Gastropoda
- Subclass: Caenogastropoda
- Order: Neogastropoda
- Superfamily: Conoidea
- Family: Terebridae
- Genus: Neoterebra
- Species: N. acrior

Binomial name
- Neoterebra acrior (Dall, 1889)

Synonyms
- Terebra acrior Dall, 1889 (original combination); Terebra limatula var. acrior Dall, 1889 (basionym)

Species of gastropod

Neoterebra acrior is a species of sea snail, a marine gastropod mollusk in the family Terebridae, the auger snails.

== Distribution ==
This species occurs in the Caribbean Sea, the Gulf of Mexico and off Puerto Rico.
