= Neoterebra hancocki =

Scientific classification
- Kingdom: Animalia
- Phylum: Mollusca
- Class: Gastropoda
- Subclass: Caenogastropoda
- Order: Neogastropoda
- Family: Terebridae
- Genus: Neoterebra
- Species: N. hancocki

Binomial name
- Neoterebra hancocki (Bratcher & Burch, 1970)

Synonyms
- Terebra hancocki Bratcher & R. D. Burch, 1970 (original combination)

Species of gastropod

Neoterebra hancocki is a species of sea snail, a marine gastropod mollusk in the family Terebridae, the auger snails.
