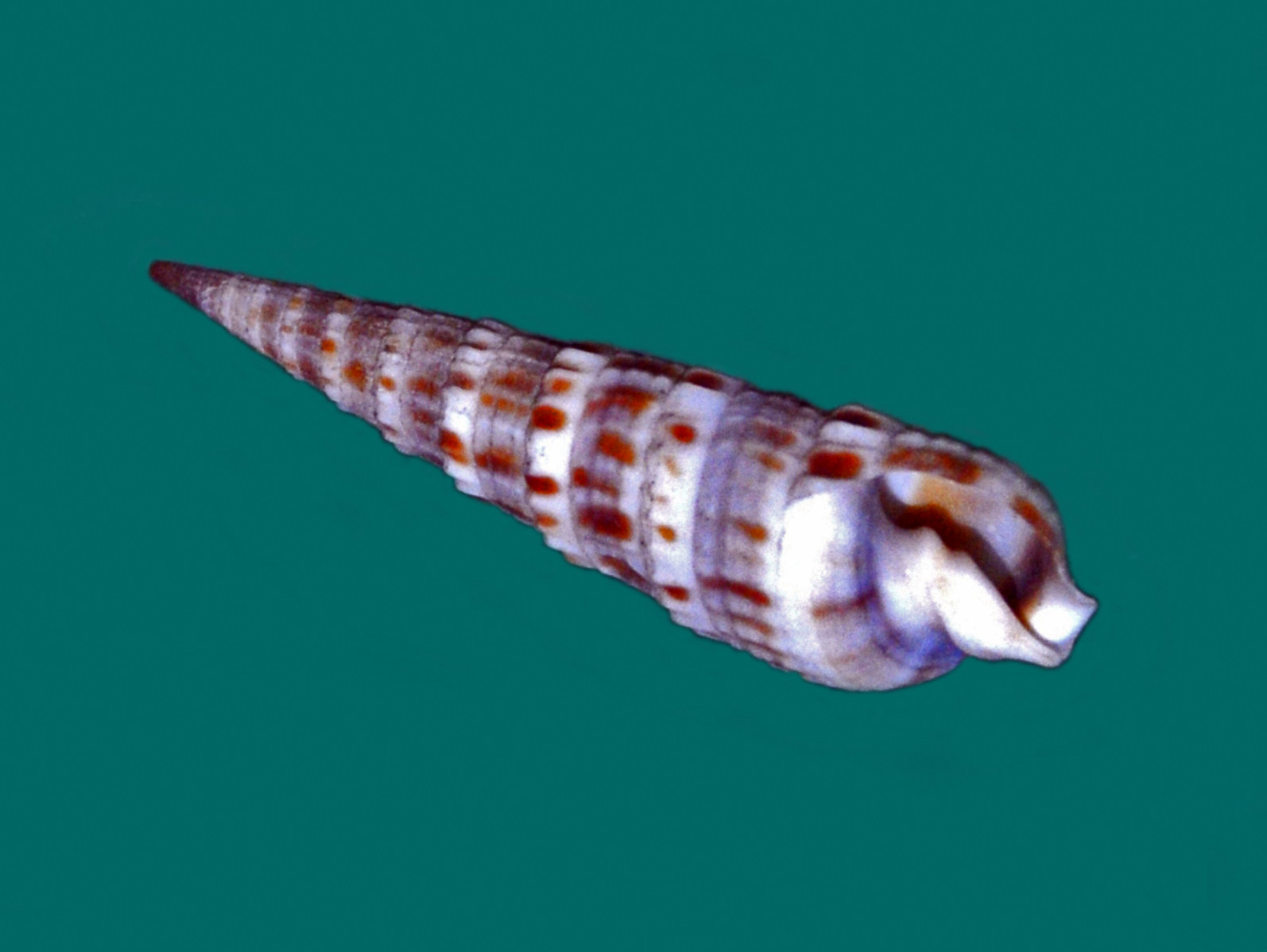
- Shell of Neoterebra armillata

Scientific classification
- Kingdom: Animalia
- Phylum: Mollusca
- Class: Gastropoda
- Subclass: Caenogastropoda
- Order: Neogastropoda
- Superfamily: Conoidea
- Family: Terebridae
- Genus: Neoterebra
- Species: N. armillata

Binomial name
- Neoterebra armillata (Hinds, 1844)

Synonyms
- Myurella albocincta Carpenter, 1857; Terebra albicostata Adams & Reeve, 1850; Terebra albocincta (Carpenter, 1957); Terebra armillata Hinds, 1844 (original combination); Terebra marginata Deshayes, 1857

= Neoterebra armillata =

Species of gastropod

Neoterebra armillata is a species of sea snail, a marine gastropod mollusk in the family Terebridae, the auger snails.

== Description ==
Shells of Neoterebra armillata can reach a length of 25–70 millimetres (0.98–2.76 in). These shells are very variable in color and pattern. Usually they show a dark gray or brown color. The subsutural band is white, with brown spots.

== Distribution ==
This species can be found in the western coast of America, from Lower California to Panama, Peru and in Galapagos.
