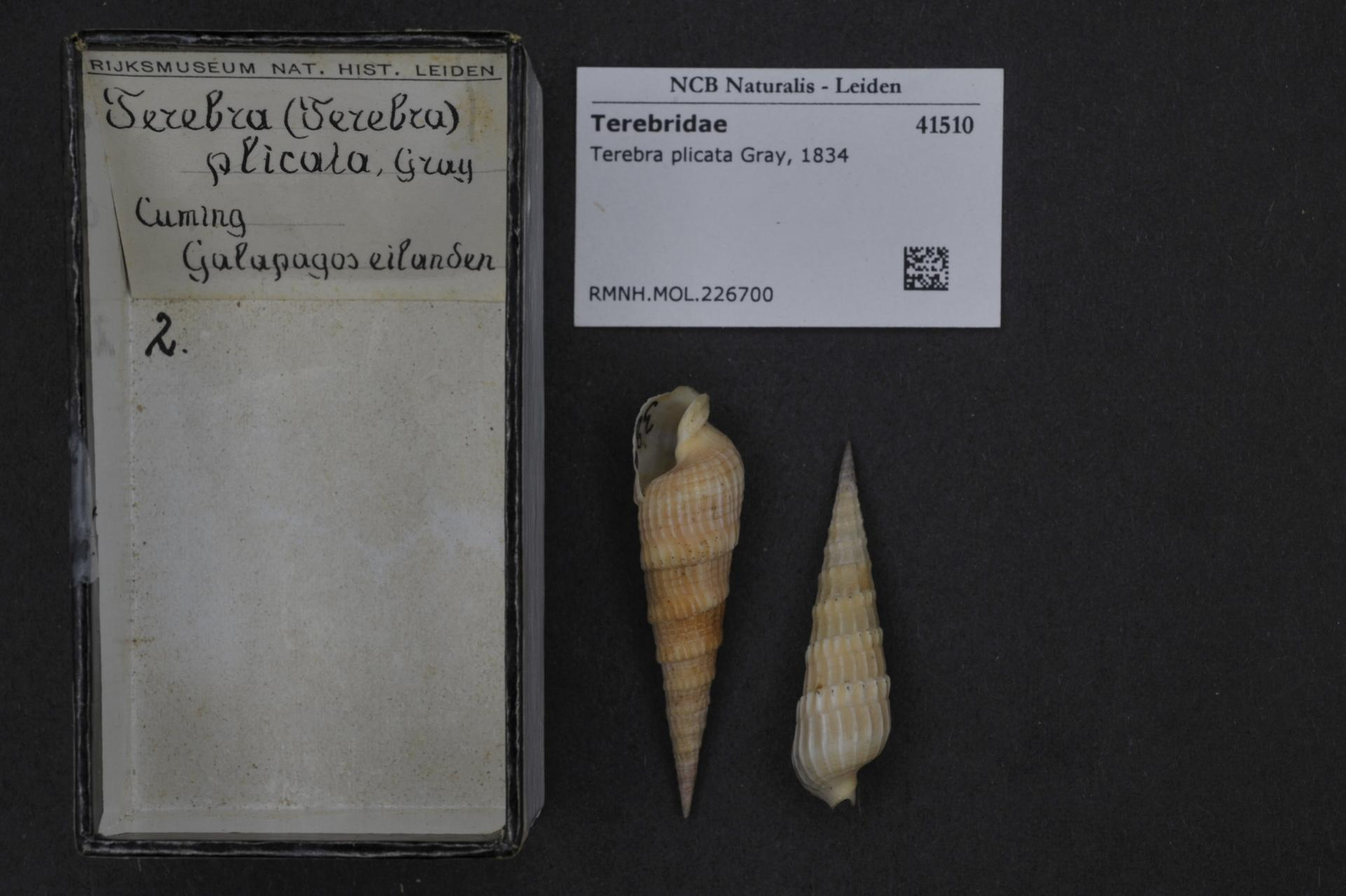

Scientific classification
- Kingdom: Animalia
- Phylum: Mollusca
- Class: Gastropoda
- Subclass: Caenogastropoda
- Order: Neogastropoda
- Family: Terebridae
- Genus: Neoterebra
- Species: N. plicata

Binomial name
- Neoterebra plicata (Gray, 1834)

Synonyms
- Terebra plicata Gray, 1834 (original combination)

= Neoterebra plicata =

Species of gastropod

Neoterebra plicata is a species of sea snail, a marine gastropod mollusk in the family Terebridae, the auger snails.
