= Neoterebra glauca =

Scientific classification
- Kingdom: Animalia
- Phylum: Mollusca
- Class: Gastropoda
- Subclass: Caenogastropoda
- Order: Neogastropoda
- Superfamily: Conoidea
- Family: Terebridae
- Genus: Neoterebra
- Species: N. glauca

Binomial name
- Neoterebra glauca (Hinds, 1844)

Synonyms
- Pristiterebra glauca (Hinds, 1844); Terebra dorothyae Bratcher & Burch, 1970; Terebra glauca Hinds, 1844; Terebra radula Hinds, 1844

Species of gastropod

Neoterebra glauca is a species of sea snail, a marine gastropod mollusk in the family Terebridae, the auger snails.
