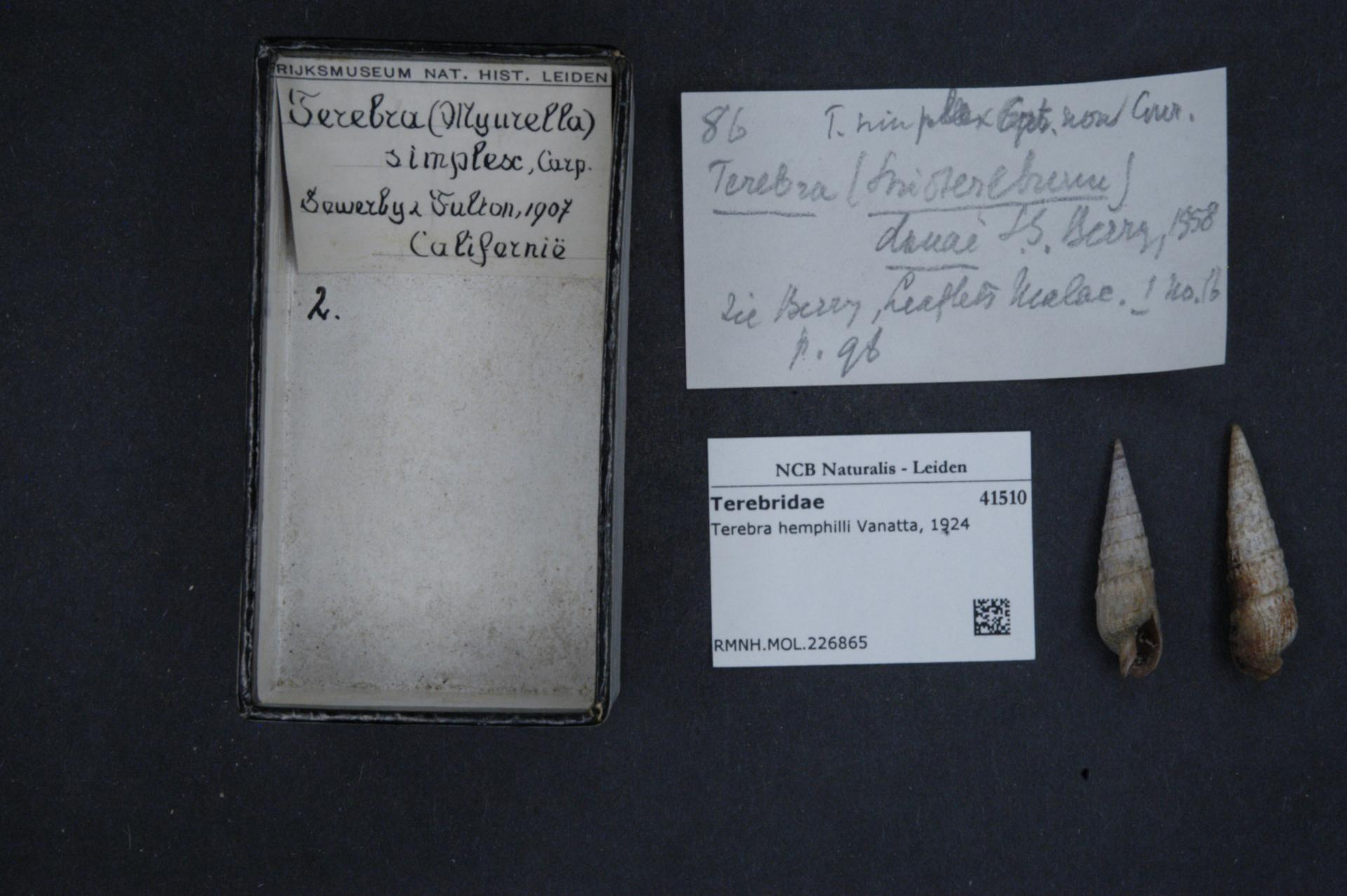

Scientific classification
- Kingdom: Animalia
- Phylum: Mollusca
- Class: Gastropoda
- Subclass: Caenogastropoda
- Order: Neogastropoda
- Family: Terebridae
- Genus: Neoterebra
- Species: N. hemphilli

Binomial name
- Neoterebra hemphilli (Vanatta, 1924)

Synonyms
- Myurella simplex Carpenter, 1865; Strioterebrum pedroanum philippianum Dall, 1921; Terebra danai Berry, 1958; Terebra hemphilli Vanatta, 1924 (original combination); Terebra pedroana hemphilli Vanatta, 1924

= Neoterebra hemphilli =

Species of gastropod

Neoterebra hemphilli is a species of sea snail, a marine gastropod mollusk in the family Terebridae, the auger snails.

== Description ==
The size of an adult shell varies between 40mm and 61mm

== Distribution ==
This marine species occurs from Santa Monica, California to Southern Baja California, Mexico
