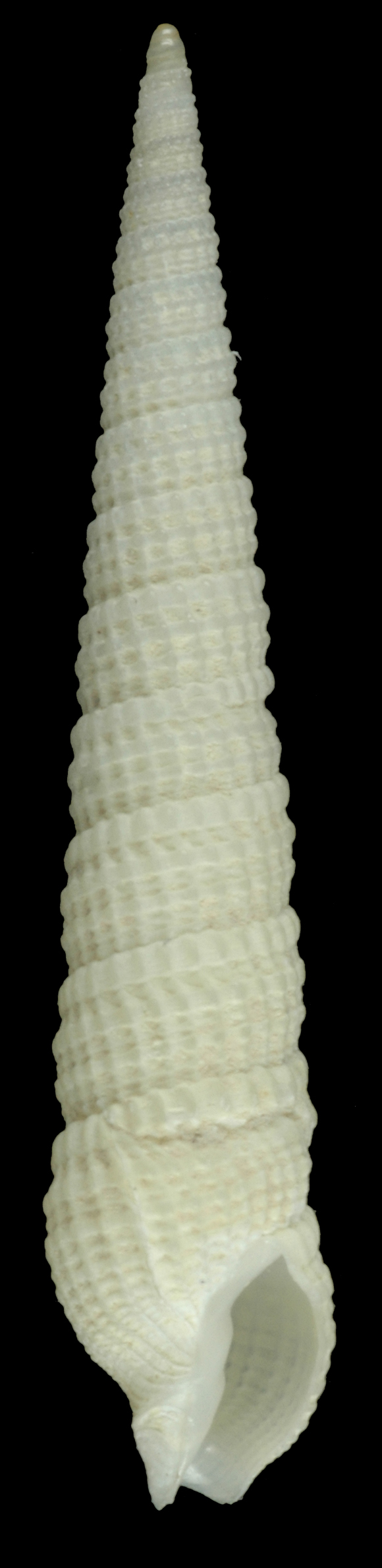
- Shell of Neoterebra guadeloupensis (holotype at MNHN, Paris)

Scientific classification
- Kingdom: Animalia
- Phylum: Mollusca
- Class: Gastropoda
- Subclass: Caenogastropoda
- Order: Neogastropoda
- Family: Terebridae
- Genus: Neoterebra; Fedosov, Malcolm, Terryn, Gorson, Modica, Holford & Puillandre, 2020

Type species
- Terebra specillata Hinds, 1844

Species
- See text

= Neoterebra =

Genus of gastropods

Neoterebra is a genus of marine snails, gastropod molluscs in the family Terebridae, subfamily Terebrinae.

== Species ==
Species within the genus Neoterebra include:

- Neoterebra acrior (Dall, 1889)
- Neoterebra alagoensis (S. Lima, Tenorio & Barros, 2007)
- Neoterebra alba (Gray, 1834)
- Neoterebra allyni (Bratcher & R. D. Burch, 1970)
- Neoterebra angelli (J. Gibson-Smith & W. Gibson-Smith, 1984)
- Neoterebra arcas (Abbott, 1954)
- Neoterebra armillata (Hinds, 1844)
- Neoterebra assu (Simone, 2012)
- Neoterebra berryi (G. B. Campbell, 1961)
- Neoterebra biminiensis (Petuch, 1987)
- Neoterebra bonardi Terryn, 2022
- Neoterebra brandi (Bratcher & R. D. Burch, 1970)
- Neoterebra brasiliensis (E. A. Smith, 1873)
- Neoterebra bridgesi (Dall, 1908)
- Neoterebra carolae (Bratcher, 1979)
- Neoterebra churea (G. B. Campbell, 1964)
- Neoterebra colombiensis (Simone & Gracia, 2006)
- Neoterebra concava (Say, 1826)
- Neoterebra corintoensis (Pilsbry & H. N. Lowe, 1932)
- Neoterebra crassireticula (Simone, 1999)
- Neoterebra crenifera (Deshayes, 1859)
- Neoterebra curacaoensis (De Jong & Coomans, 1988)
- Neoterebra dislocata (Say, 1822)
- Neoterebra doellojuradoi (Carcelles, 1953)
- Neoterebra elata (Hinds, 1844)
- Neoterebra frigata (Hinds, 1844)
- Neoterebra glauca (Hinds, 1844)
- Neoterebra glossema (Schwengel, 1942)
- Neoterebra guadeloupensis Malcolm, Terryn & Fedosov, 2020
- Neoterebra guayaquilensis (E. A. Smith, 1880)
- Neoterebra hancocki (Bratcher & R. D. Burch, 1970)
- Neoterebra hemphilli (Vanatta, 1924)
- Neoterebra hondurasiensis (Gargiulo, 2016)
- Neoterebra incisa (Faber, 2007)
- Neoterebra intertincta (Hinds, 1844)
- Neoterebra intumescyra (S. Lima, Tenorio & Barros, 2007)
- Neoterebra jacquelinae (Bratcher & R. D. Burch, 1970)
- Neoterebra juanica (Dall & Simpson, 1901)
- Neoterebra lamyi (Terryn, 2011)
- Neoterebra larvaeformis (Hinds, 1844)
- Neoterebra leptapsis (Simone, 1999)
- Neoterebra limatula (Dall, 1889)
- Neoterebra lucana (Dall, 1908)
- Neoterebra mugridgeae (García, 1999)
- Neoterebra nassula (Dall, 1889)
- Neoterebra pacei (Petuch, 1987)
- Neoterebra panamensis (Dall, 1908)
- Neoterebra pedroana (Dall, 1908)
- Neoterebra plicata (Gray, 1834)
- Neoterebra portobeloensis Terryn, 2023
- Neoterebra protexta (Conrad, 1846)
- Neoterebra puncturosa (Berry, 1959)
- Neoterebra rancheria (Bratcher, 1988)
- Neoterebra riosi (Bratcher & Cernohorsky, 1985)
- Neoterebra roperi (Pilsbry & H. N. Lowe, 1932)
- Neoterebra rushii (Dall, 1889)
- Neoterebra salangoensis Terryn, 2022
- Neoterebra salvadorae Terryn & Fraussen, 2022
- Neoterebra sanjuanensis (Pilsbry & H. N. Lowe, 1932)
- Neoterebra shyana (Bratcher & R. D. Burch, 1970)
- Neoterebra simonei (S. Lima, Tenorio & Barros, 2007)
- Neoterebra specillata (Hinds, 1844)
- Neoterebra spirosulcata (Simone, 1999)
- Neoterebra sterigma (Simone, 1999)
- Neoterebra sterigmoides (Simone & Gracia, 2006)
- Neoterebra stohleri (Bratcher & R. D. Burch, 1970)
- Neoterebra tiarella (Deshayes, 1857)
- Neoterebra variegata (Gray, 1834)
- Neoterebra vinosa (Dall, 1889)
