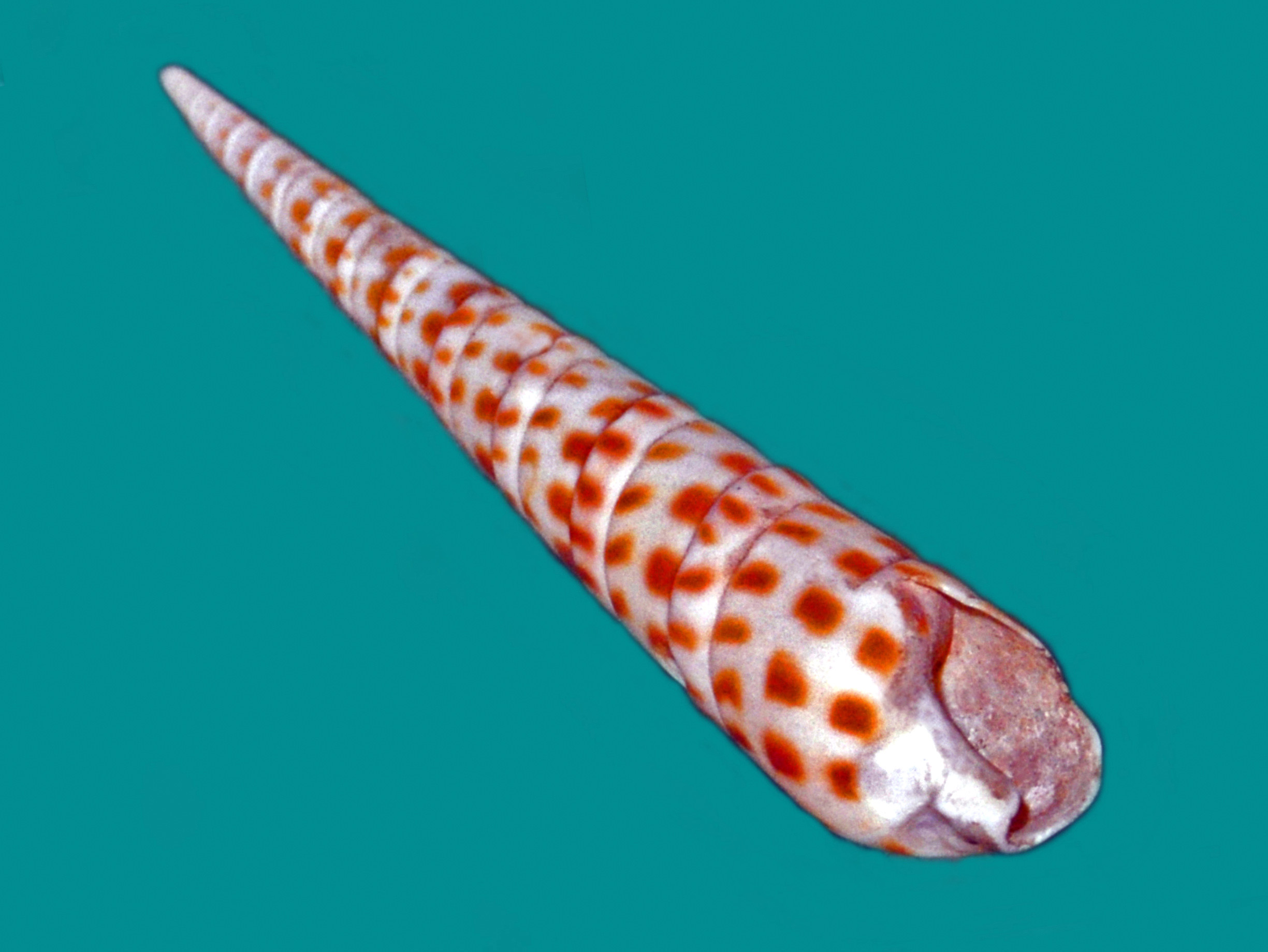
- Shell of Myurellopsis kilburni

Scientific classification
- Kingdom: Animalia
- Phylum: Mollusca
- Class: Gastropoda
- Subclass: Caenogastropoda
- Order: Neogastropoda
- Family: Terebridae
- Genus: Myurellopsis
- Species: M. kilburni

Binomial name
- Myurellopsis kilburni (Burch, 1965)

Synonyms
- Myurella kilburni (R. D. Burch, 1965); Terebra areolata A. Adams & Reeve, 1850; Terebra kilburni R. D. Burch, 1965 (original combination); Subula areolata (Link, 1807); Terebra subulata Lamarck, 1816, not to be confused with Terebra subulata (Linnaeus, 1767); Vertagus areolatus Link, 1807

= Myurellopsis kilburni =

Species of gastropod

Myurellopsis kilburni is a species of sea snail, a marine gastropod mollusc in the family Terebridae, the auger snails.

== Etymology ==
The species name kilburni honors the South African malacologist Richard Kilburn.

== Description ==
Shells of Myurella kilburni can reach a length of 43 millimetres (1.7 in). These shells are slender and show an ivory color with fulvous-brown or lavender-brown markings.

== Distribution and habitat ==
This species can be found from South Africa to French Polynesia and Hawaii, at depth of 1 to 110 m.
