= List of non-marine molluscs of Taiwan =

Location of Taiwan

The non-marine mollusks of Taiwan are a part of the molluscan fauna of Taiwan. A number of species of non-marine mollusks are found in the wild in Taiwan.

Summary table of number of species

	Taiwan
freshwater gastropods	??
land gastropods	329 land snails + some slugs
gastropods altogether	???
bivalves	??
molluscs altogether	???

== Land gastropods ==
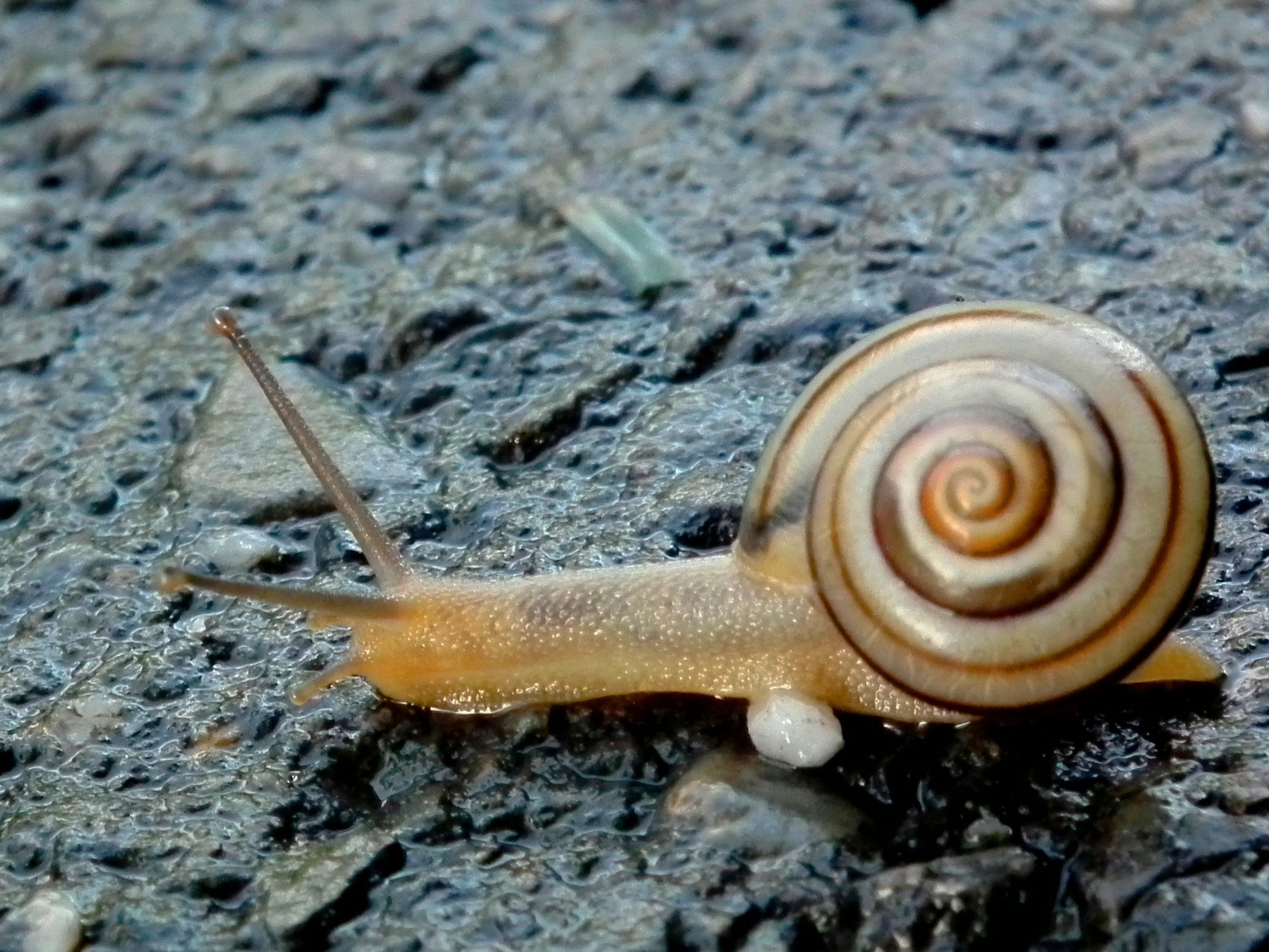
Satsuma batanica

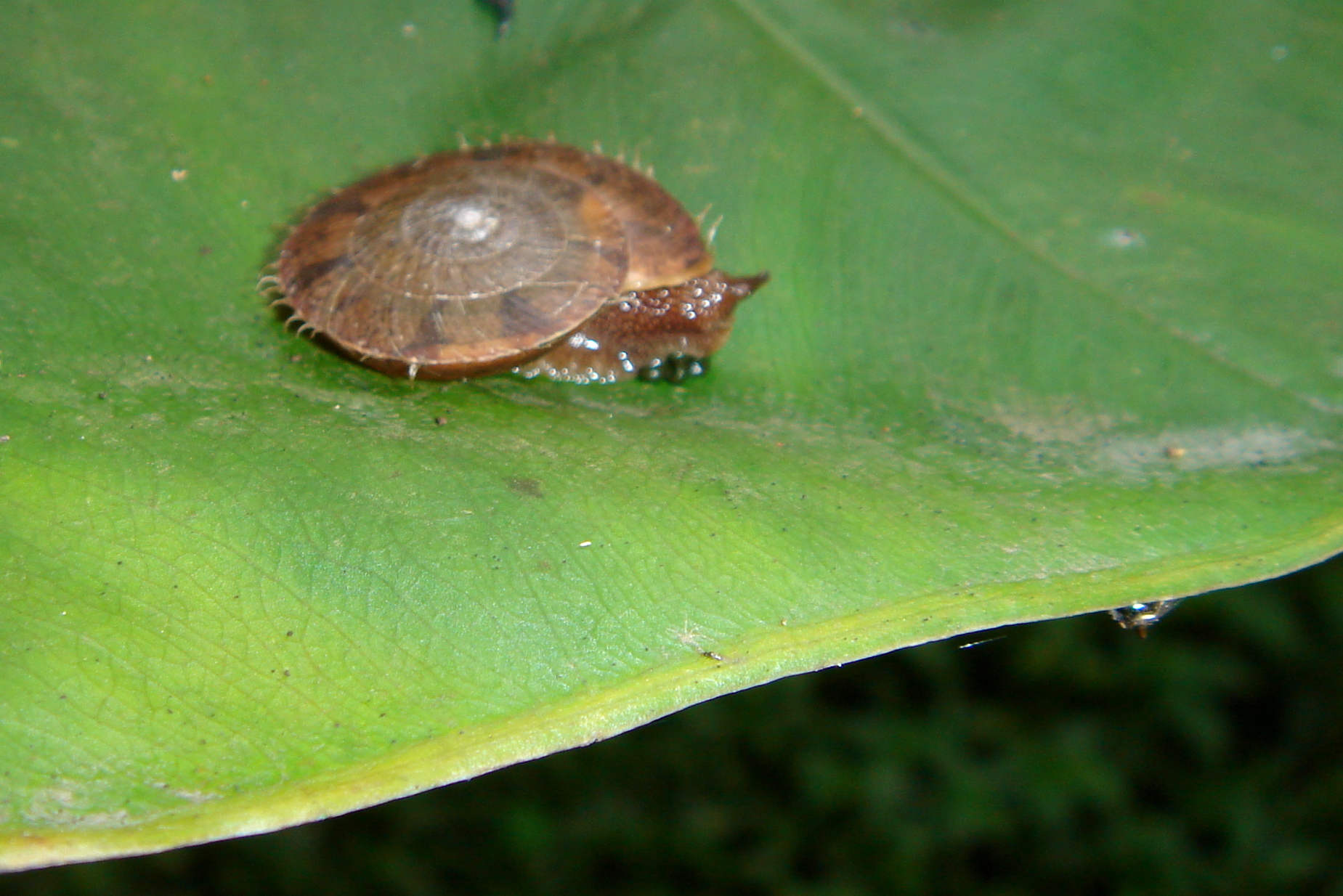
Aegista impexa

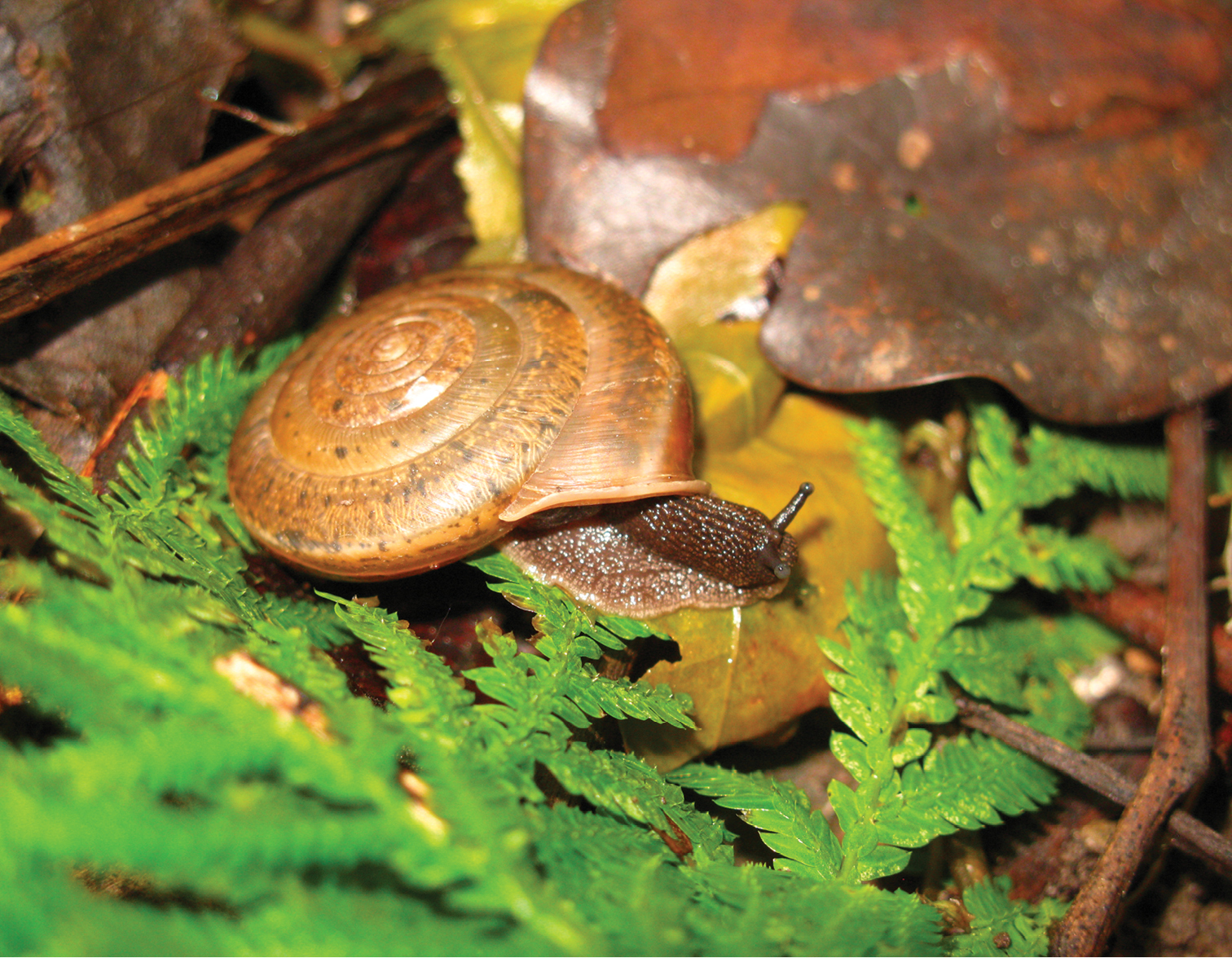
Aegista diversifamilia

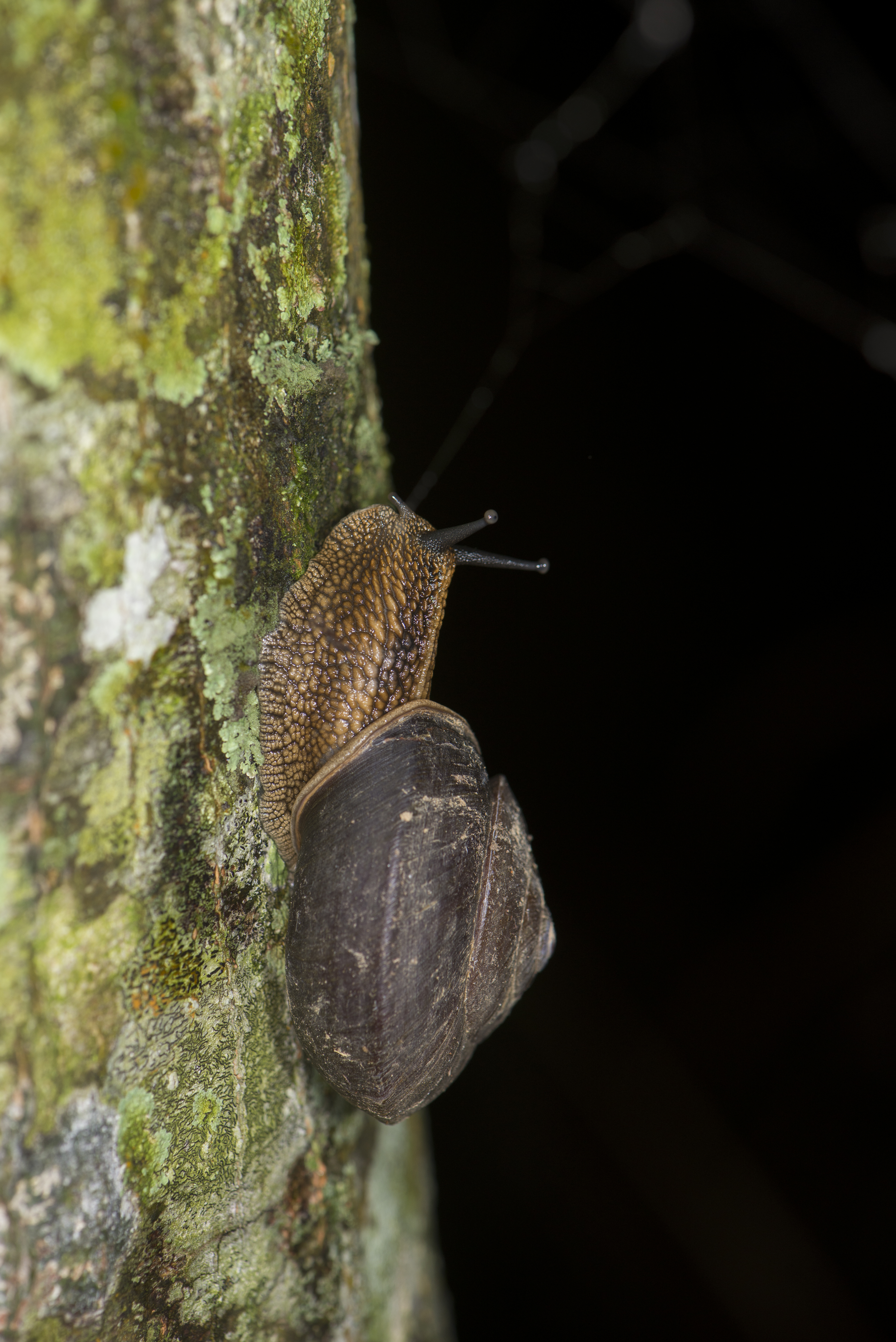
Nesiohelix swinhoei

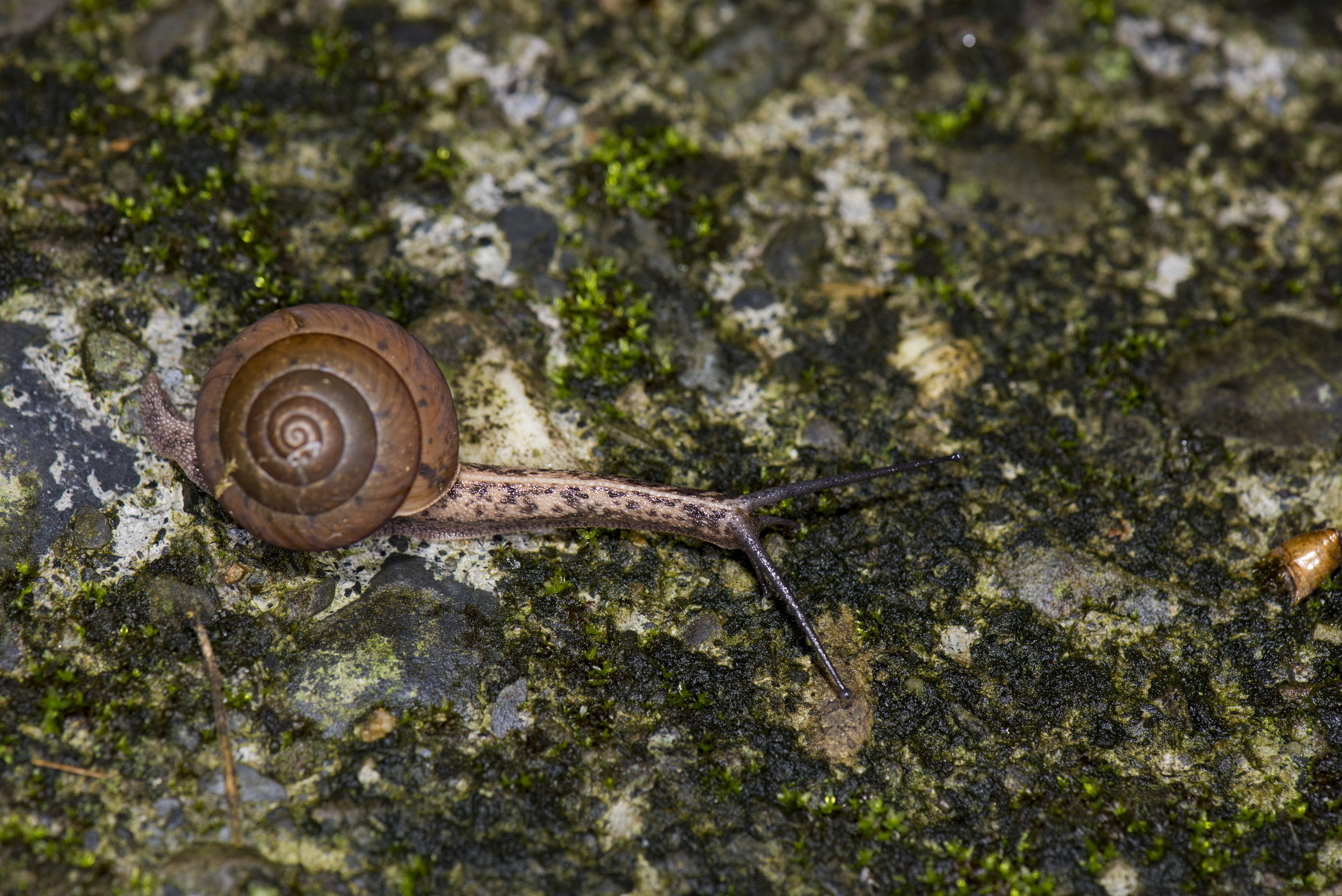
Satsuma sp.

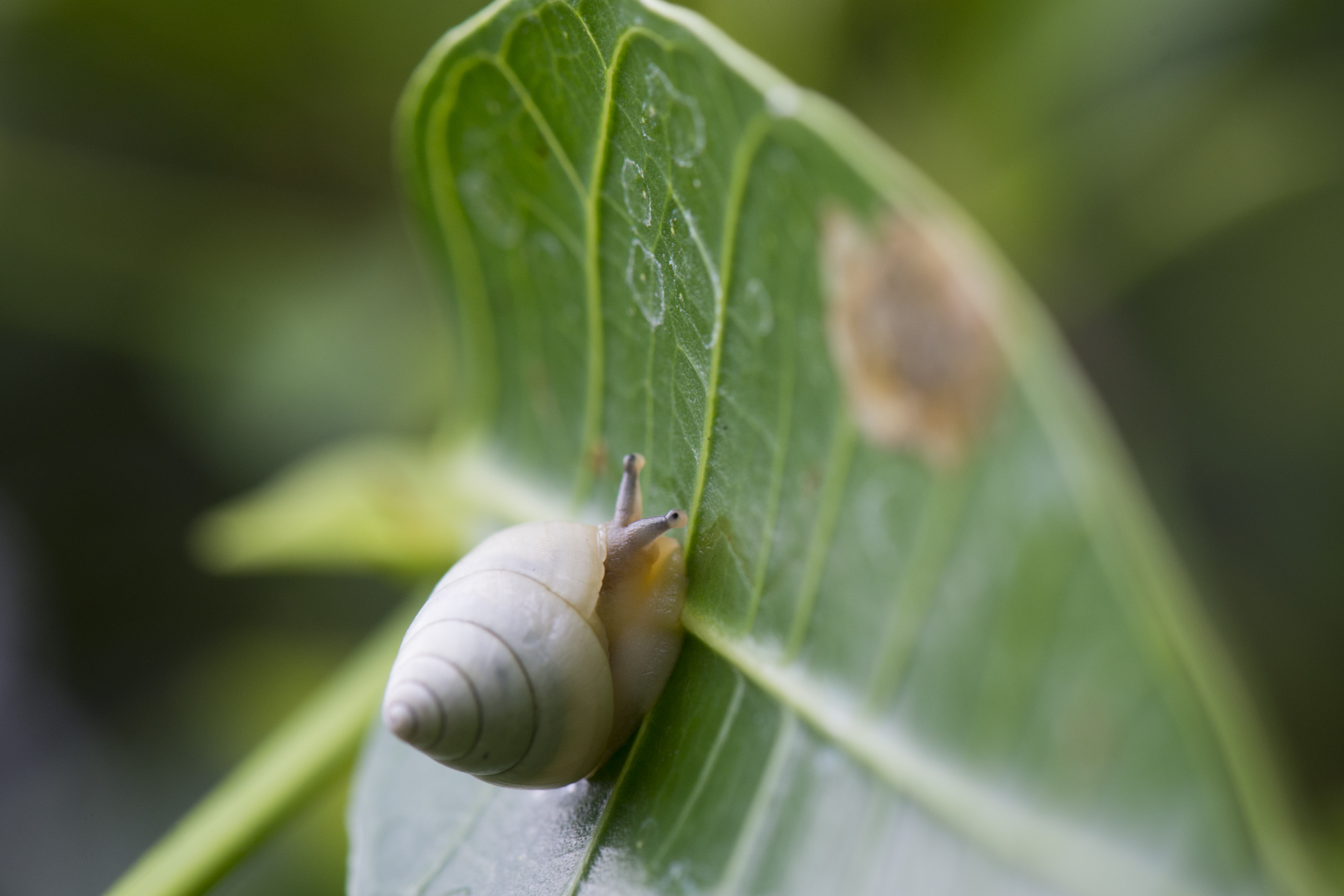
Satsuma sp.

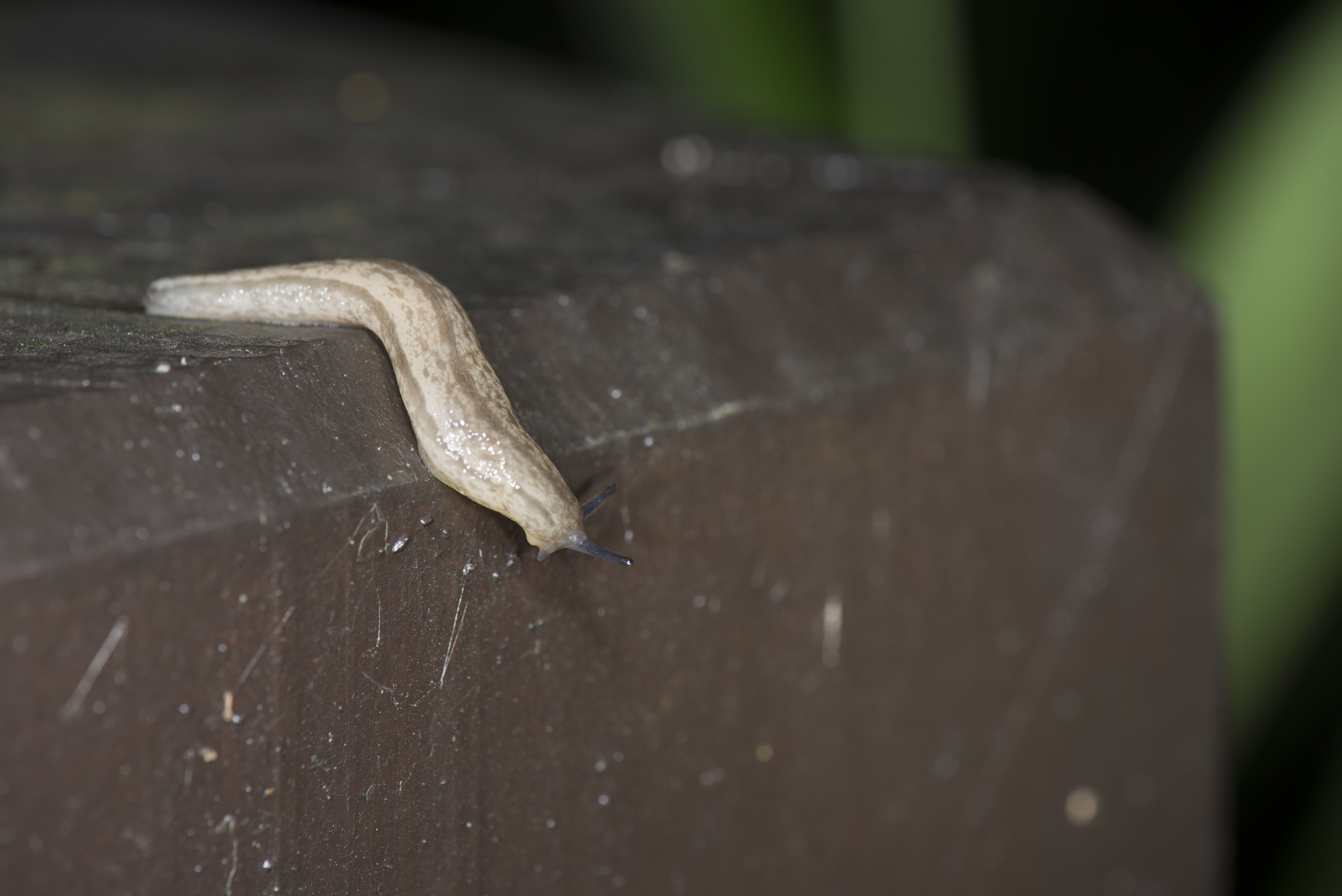
Meghimatium bilineatum

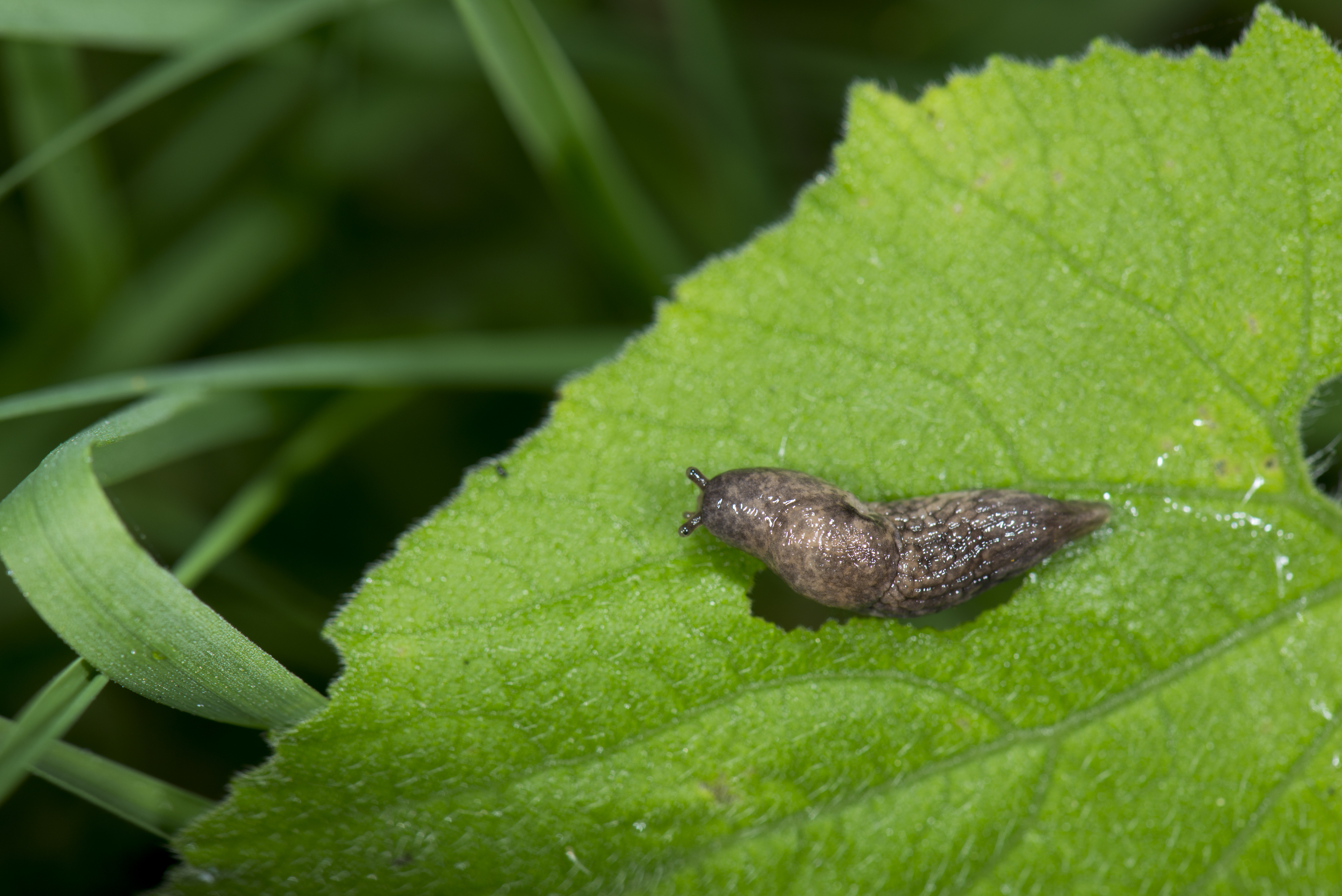
Deroceras reticulatum

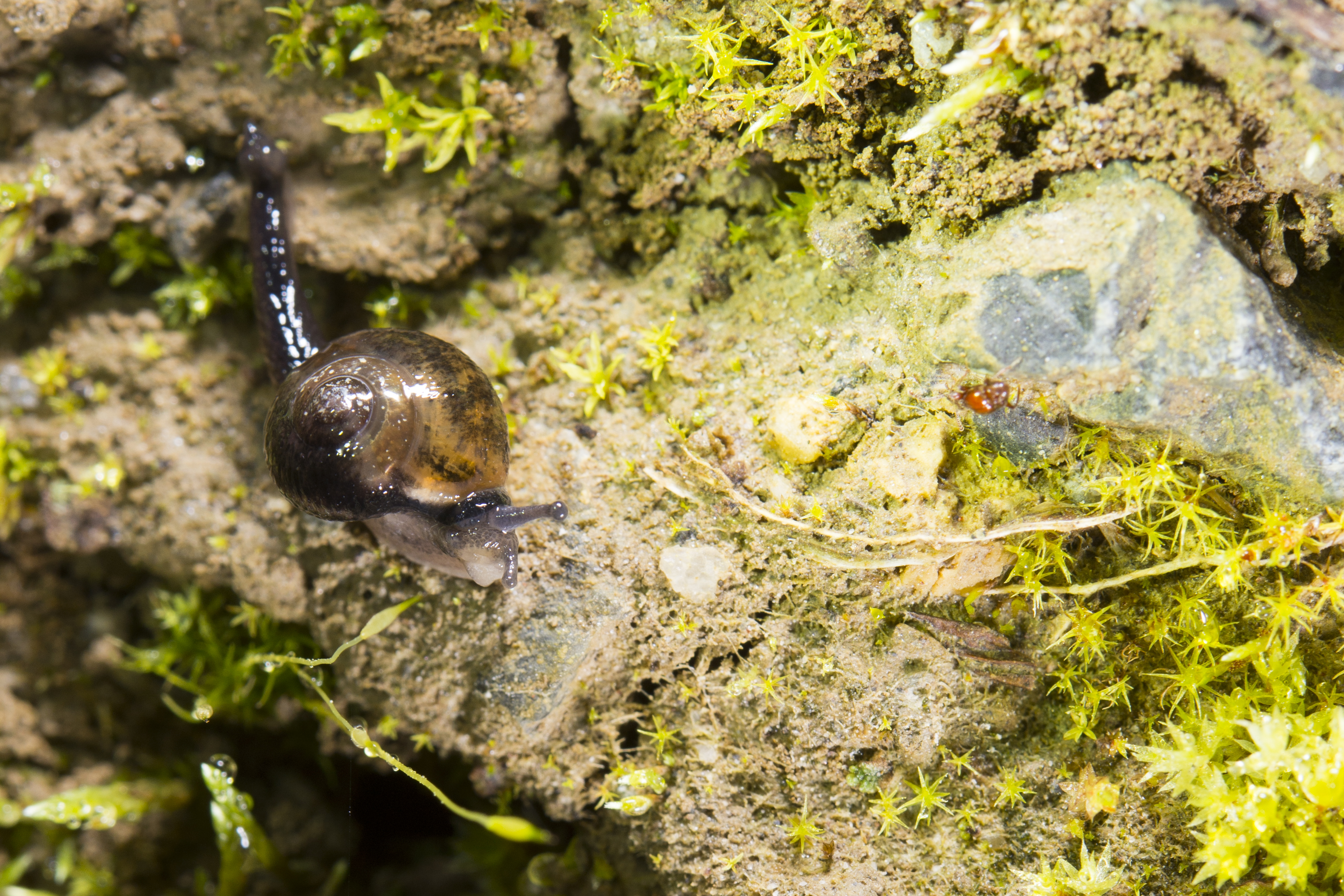
Ovachlamys fulgens

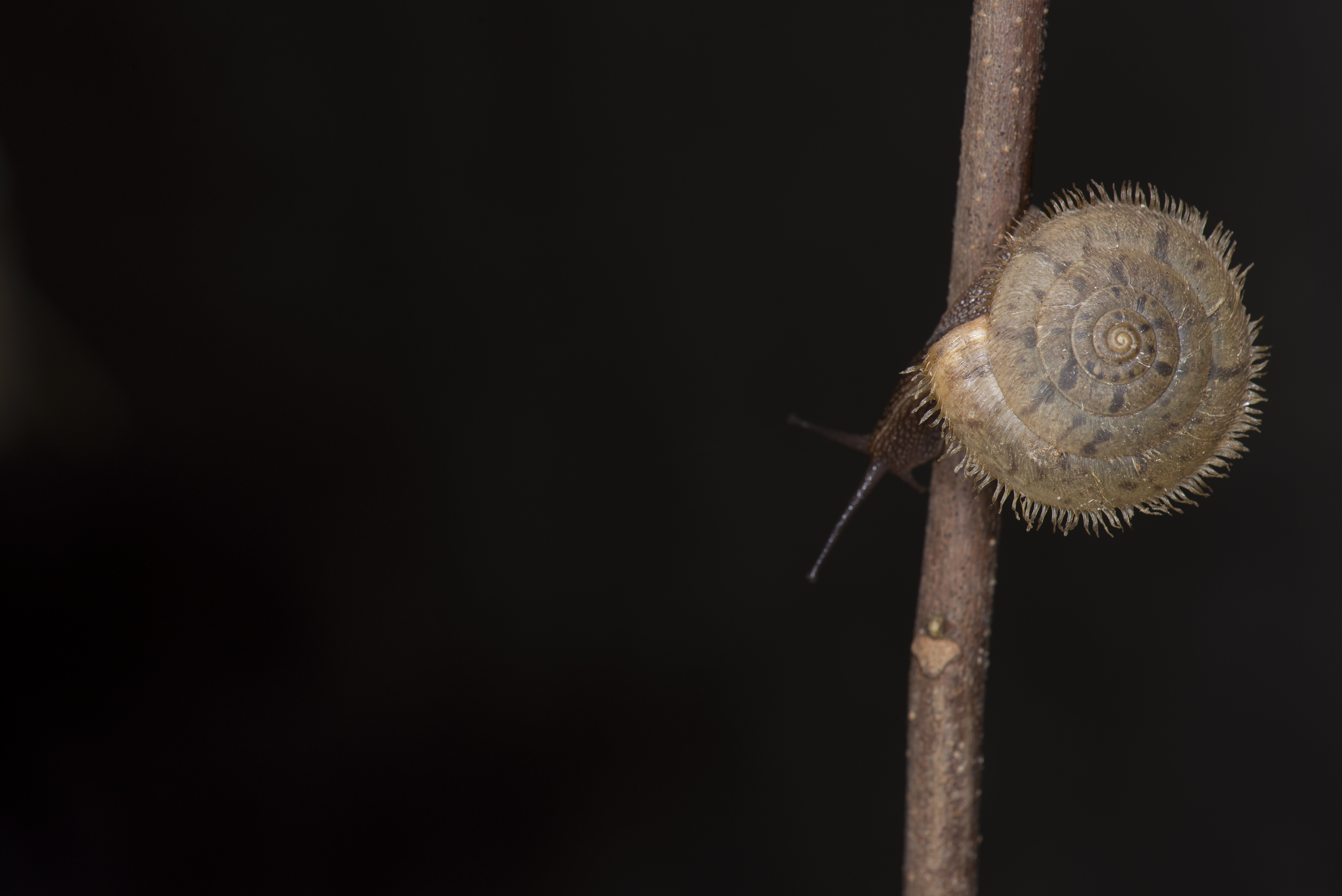
Aegista mackensii

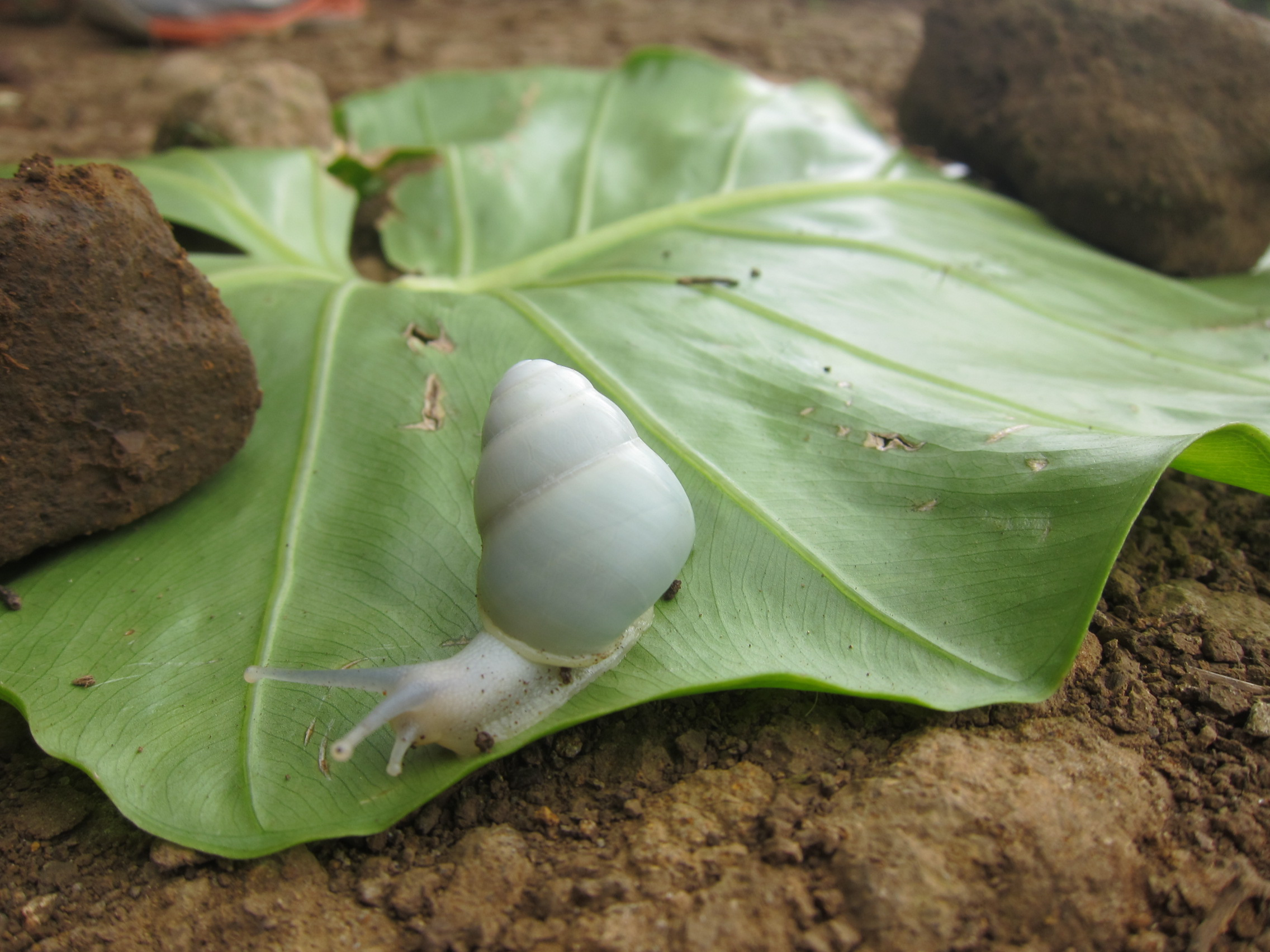
Helicostyla okadai

Assimineidae

- Assiminea nitida (Pease, 1864) – on Pratas Island

Truncatellidae

- Truncatella guerinii A. & J. B. Villa, 1841 – on Pratas Island
- Truncatella pfeifferi Martens, 1860 – on Pratas Island

Ellobiidae

- Melampus castanea (Mühlfeld, 1818) – on Pratas Island
- Melampus nuxeastaneus Kuroda, 1949 – on Pratas Island
- Melampus flavus (Gmelin, 1791) – on Pratas Island
- Melampus sculptus (Pfeiffer, 1855) – on Pratas Island
- Melampus taeniolatus (Hombron & Jacquinot, 1854) – on Pratas Island
- Tralia malanastoma Garrett, 1873 – on Pratas Island

Veronicellidae

- Laevicaulis alte (Férussac, 1821) – on Pratas Island

Clausiliidae

- Hemiphaedusa (Hemizaptyx) antuensis chichiensis Nordsieck, 2005
- Hemiphaedusa (Hemizaptyx) hemmeni Nordsieck, 2005
  - Hemiphaedusa (Hemizaptyx) hemmeni yucola Nordsieck, 2005
- Hemiphaedusa (Hemizaptyx) longiplicata Nordsieck, 2005
- Thaumatoptyx costellata Nordsieck, 2005
- Thaumatoptyx gonyptyx lacuphila Nordsieck, 2005
- Thaumatoptyx uraniscoptyx diploptyx Nordsieck, 2005

Pupillidae

- Gastrocopta pediculus (Shuttleworth, 1852) – on Pratas Island
  - Gastrocopta pediculus ovatula (Moellendorff, 1890)
- Gastrocopta servilis (Gould, 1843) – on Pratas Island

Vertiginidae

- Nesopupa yamagutii Kuroda, 1941 – on Pratas Island, endemic to Taiwan
- Vertigo sp. – on Pratas Island

Succineidae

- Succinea erythrophana Ancey, 1883 – on Pratas Island

Subulinidae

- Allopeas gracile(T. Hutton, 1834) – on Pratas Island
- Opeas turgidulum (Heude, 1841) – on Pratas Island
- Paropeas achatinaceum (Pfeiffer, 1846) – on Pratas Island
- Subulina octona (Bruguière, 1792) – on Pratas Island

Achatinidae

- Achatina fulica Bowdich, 1822 – exotic species, on Pratas Island

Streptaxidae

- Indoennea bicolor (Hutton, 1834) – on Pratas Island
- Elma Adams, 1866

Helicarionidae

- Liardetia yaeyamensis (Pilsbry, 1901) – on Pratas Island

Gastrodontidae

- Zonitoides arboreus (Say, 1816) – on Pratas Island

Philomycidae

- Meghimatium burchi Tsai & Wu, 2008
- Meghimatium bilineatum
- Meghimatium fruhstorferi (Collinge, 1901)
- Meghimatium pictum

Arionidae

- Arion distinctus Mabille, 1868

Agriolimacidae

- Deroceras laeve (O. F. Müller, 1774)

Camaenidae

- Acusta tourannensis (Souleyet, 1842) – on Pratas Island
- Bradybaena similaris (Férussac, 1822) – on Pratas Island
- Aegista subchinensis
- Aegista mackensii
- Aegista impexa

== Bivalvia ==
Unionidae

- Unio douglasiae taiwanicus (Pilsbry, 1905)
- Cristaria tenuis (Gray, 1833) [=Cristaria discoidea (Lea, 1834)]
- Sinanodonta woodiana (Lea, 1834)

== See also ==
- List of marine molluscs of Taiwan

Lists of molluscs of surrounding countries:

- List of non-marine molluscs of China
- List of non-marine molluscs of Hong Kong
- List of non-marine molluscs of the Philippines
- List of non-marine molluscs of Japan
