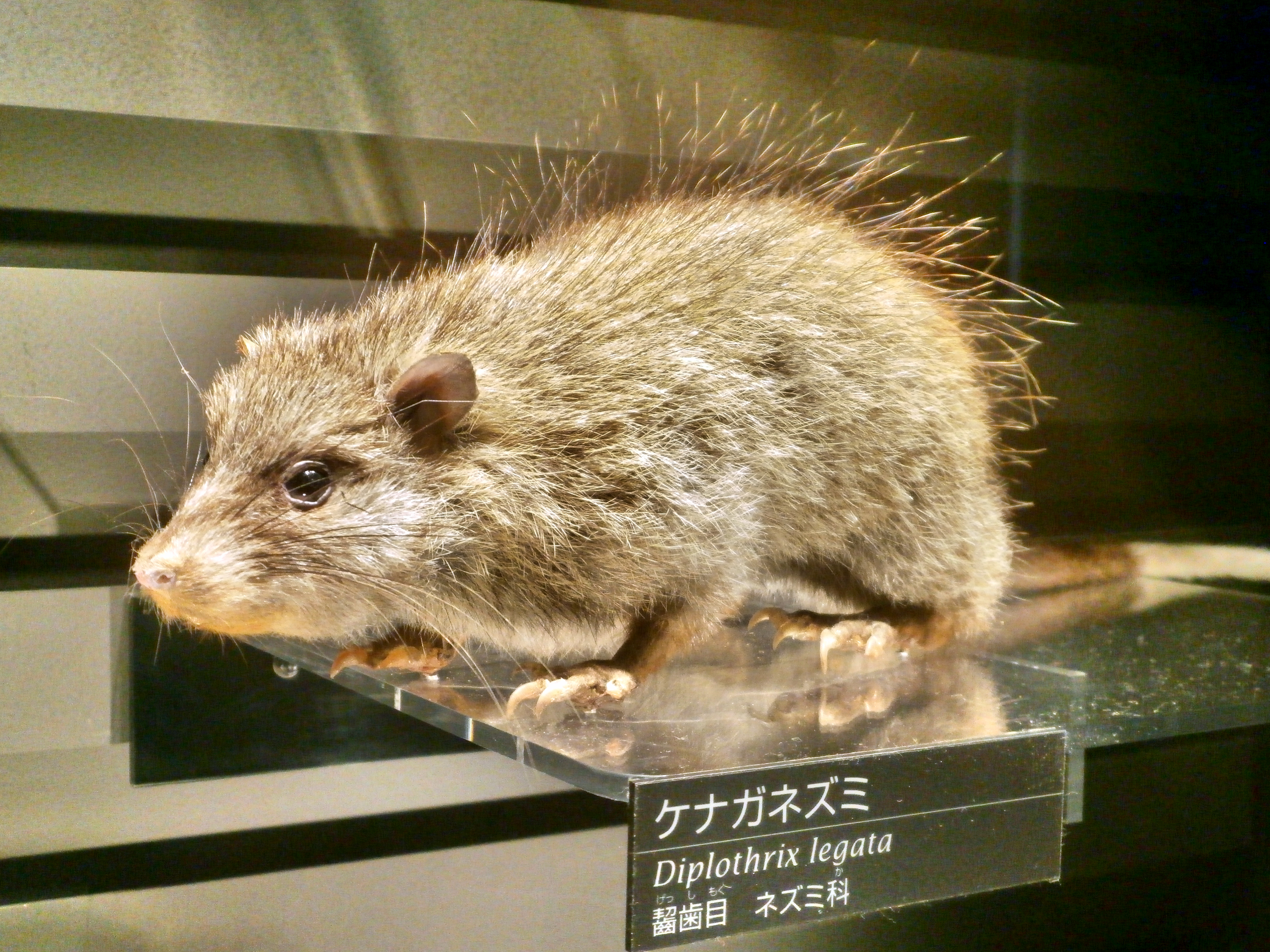
- Stuffed specimen. Exhibit in the National Museum of Nature and Science, Tokyo, Japan.

Conservation status
- Endangered (IUCN 3.1)

Scientific classification
- Kingdom: Animalia
- Phylum: Chordata
- Class: Mammalia
- Order: Rodentia
- Family: Muridae
- Genus: Diplothrix
- Species: D. legata

Binomial name
- Diplothrix legata (Thomas, 1906)

Synonyms
- Diplothrix legatus; Lenothrix legata Thomas, 1906

= Ryukyu long-tailed giant rat =

Ryukyu long-tailed giant rat Temporal range: Late Pleistocene–Recent

Species of rodent

The Ryukyu long-tailed giant rat or Ryukyu rat (Diplothrix legata), also known as the rodent in the family Muridae. It is the only extant species in the genus Diplothrix and is endemic to the central Ryukyu Islands of Japan (Amami-oshima, Tokuno-shima, and Okinawa-jima). Its natural habitat consists of temperate forests.

== Description ==
The Ryukyu long-tailed giant rat is the largest rodent endemic to the central Ryukyu Islands and the largest arboreal murid native to Japan. The body length of both sexes is estimated to be over 56 centimetres at sexual maturity.

D. legata has experienced a population bottleneck in the past and, as a result, may have evolved pleomorphic sperm head morphology (a wide variety of sperm-head shapes), although more studies are needed to explore this variation. The size of its sperm is also relatively larger than that of other rodents.

== Behaviour ==
This species is nocturnal and arboreal. Its diet includes both plants, such as fruits, and animals, including invertebrates like butterflies, beetles, and slugs (of the genus Meghimatium sp.). Plant items were found in similar amounts in the stomach contents of males and females, whereas more animal items were found in the stomachs of females.

D. legata may serve as an important seed disperser across the central Ryukyu Islands, which lack the typical dispersers like primates, squirrels, and large birds.

Dental microwear texture analysis suggests a seasonal dietary shift from soft-bodied invertebrates in summer to tougher foods such as acorns in winter.

This species is believed to have its breeding season between September and February. Videos of nesting individuals reveal that nesting material, including branches and leaves, were carried into the nest box between October and February. From February to March, the calls of newborns could be heard, with multiple overlapping calls suggesting a litter of several pups. However, nest predation on young rats by habu pit vipers appears to be high, with no newborns being observed leaving the nest.

== Conservation ==
The species is threatened by habitat loss, predation by feral cats (with studies finding that the rat contributed 23% of feral cat's diet on Amami-Oshima), and introduced nematode and helminth parasites.
