= William H. Heard (biologist) =

American malacologist (born 1935)

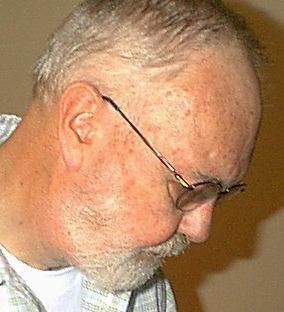
William H. Heard in 2002.

William Henry Heard (born 1935 in Michigan, U.S.) is an American malacologist, and an authority on freshwater mollusks, especially freshwater pelecypods (clams). He is an emeritus professor in the Department of Biological Sciences, at Florida State University.

Heard was the winner of the "Lifetime Achievement Award" for 2001 from the Freshwater Mollusk Conservation Society. He has had two species of mayflies named in his honor: Symbiocloeon heardi Müller-Liebenau and Povilla heardi Hubbard. Heard discovered these insects in Thailand, where they were living within the shells of freshwater clams.

== Selected publications ==
- Comparative life histories of North American pill clams (Sphaeriidae: Pisidium). 1965. Malacologia, 2: 381-411
- Recent Eupera (Pelecypoda; Sphaeriidae) in the United States. 1965. Amer. Midland Nat. 74(2): 309-317
- A re-evaluation of the recent Unionacea (Pelecypoda) of North America. Malacologia, 10(2): 333-355 (with R. H. Guckert)
- Anatomical systematics of freshwater mussels. 1974. Malacol. Rev., 7: 41-42
- Reproduction of fingernail clams (Sphaeriidae: Sphaerium and Musculium). 1977. Malacologia, 16: 421-455
- Identification Manual of the Freshwater Clams of Florida. 1979. Fla. Dept. Environmental Regulation, Technical Series 4(2): 1-83. (available for download: PDF)
- Bivalvia I. 1998. 145pp. Soc. Experimental and Descriptive Malacology. (editor, with John B. Burch)
