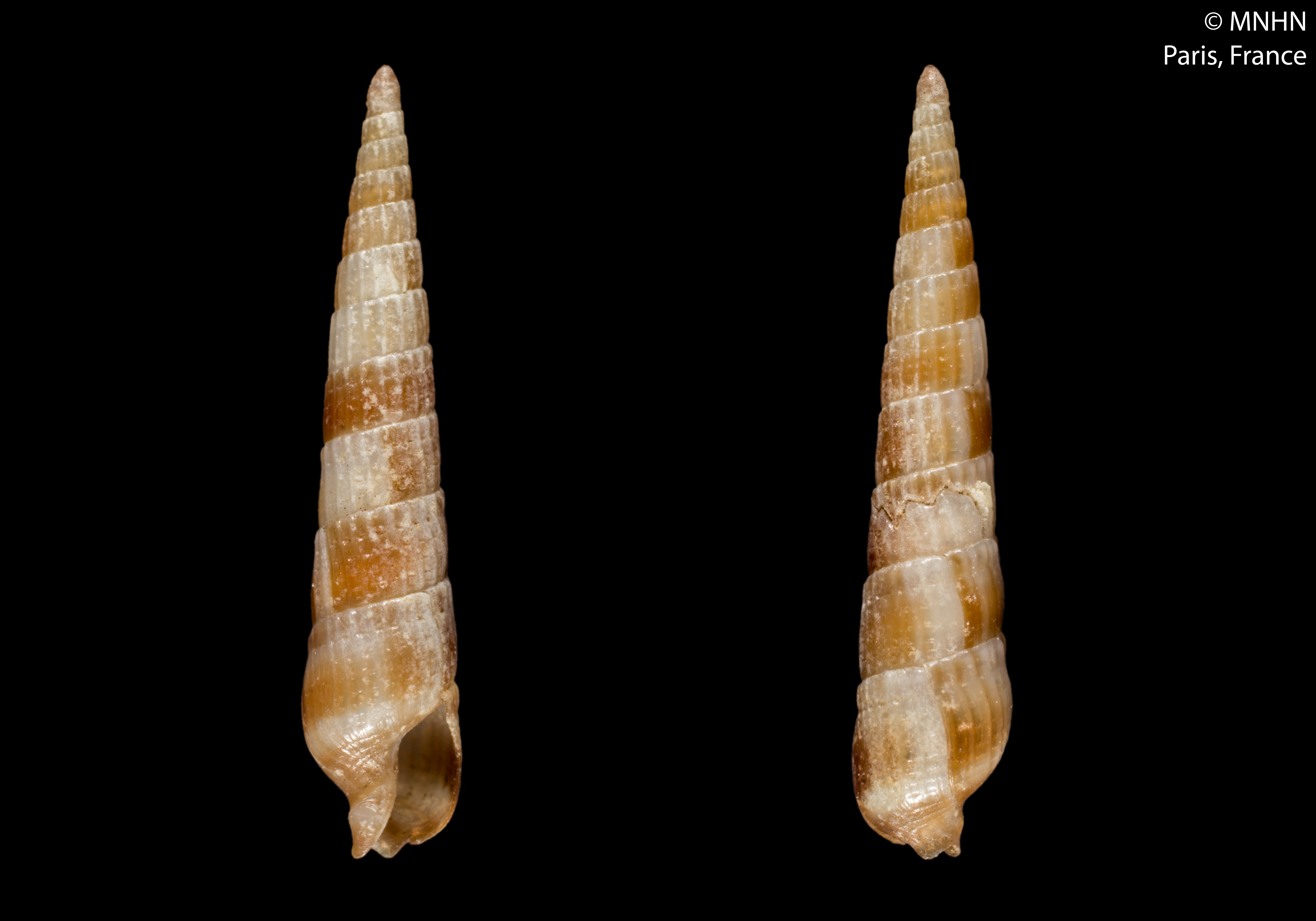
- Shell of Myurellopsis monicae (holotype at MNHN, Paris)

Scientific classification
- Kingdom: Animalia
- Phylum: Mollusca
- Class: Gastropoda
- Subclass: Caenogastropoda
- Order: Neogastropoda
- Family: Terebridae
- Genus: Myurellopsis
- Species: M. monicae

Binomial name
- Myurellopsis monicae (Terryn, 2005)

Synonyms
- Myurella monicae (Terryn, 2005); Terebra monicae Terryn, 2005

= Myurellopsis monicae =

Species of gastropod

Myurellopsis monicae is a species of sea snail, a marine gastropod mollusc in the family Terebridae, the auger snails.

== Description ==
The length of the shell attains 9.9 mm.

== Distribution ==
This marine species occurs off Réunion.
