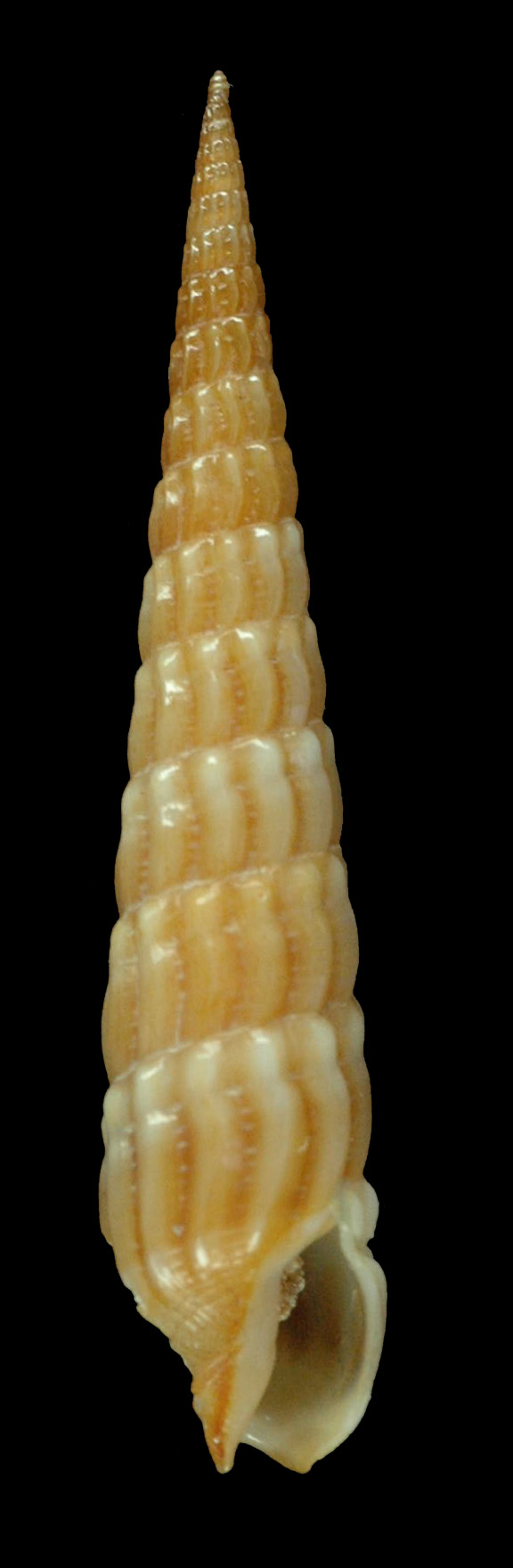
- Shell of Myurellopsis paucistriata (specimen at MNHN, Paris)

Scientific classification
- Kingdom: Animalia
- Phylum: Mollusca
- Class: Gastropoda
- Subclass: Caenogastropoda
- Order: Neogastropoda
- Family: Terebridae
- Genus: Myurellopsis
- Species: M. paucistriata

Binomial name
- Myurellopsis paucistriata E.A. Smith, 1873

Synonyms
- Myurella paucistrata E.A. Smith, 1873; Myurella paucistriata E. A. Smith, 1873 (original combination); Terebra paucistriata (E.A. Smith, 1873)

= Myurellopsis paucistriata =

Species of gastropod

Myurellopsis paucistriata is a species of sea snail, a marine gastropod mollusc in the family Terebridae, the auger snails.

== Distribution ==
This marine species occurs off Papua New Guinea and Fiji
