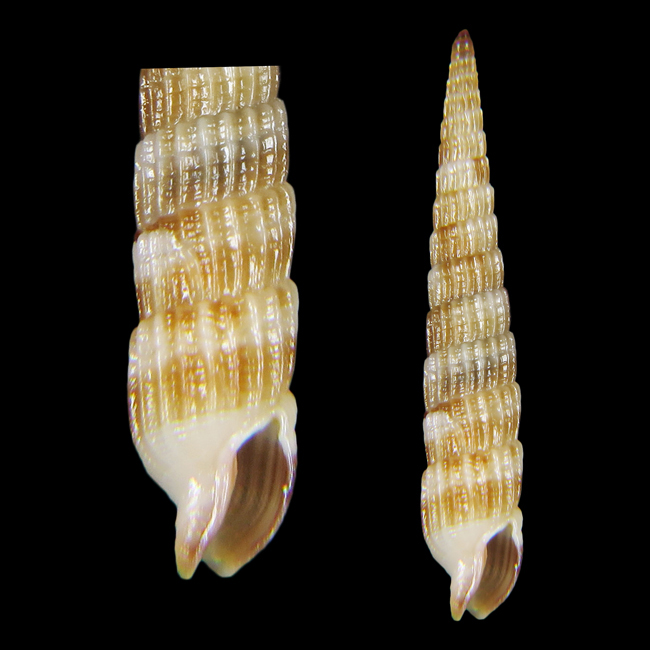

Scientific classification
- Kingdom: Animalia
- Phylum: Mollusca
- Class: Gastropoda
- Subclass: Caenogastropoda
- Order: Neogastropoda
- Family: Terebridae
- Genus: Myurellopsis
- Species: M. guphilae

Binomial name
- Myurellopsis guphilae (Poppe, Tagaro & Terryn, 2009)

Synonyms
- Clathroterebra guphilae (Poppe, Tagaro & Terryn, 2009); Terebra guphilae Poppe, Tagaro & Terryn, 2009 (original combination)

= Myurellopsis guphilae =

Species of gastropod

Myurellopsis guphilae is a species of sea snail, a marine gastropod mollusc in the family Terebridae, the auger snails.
