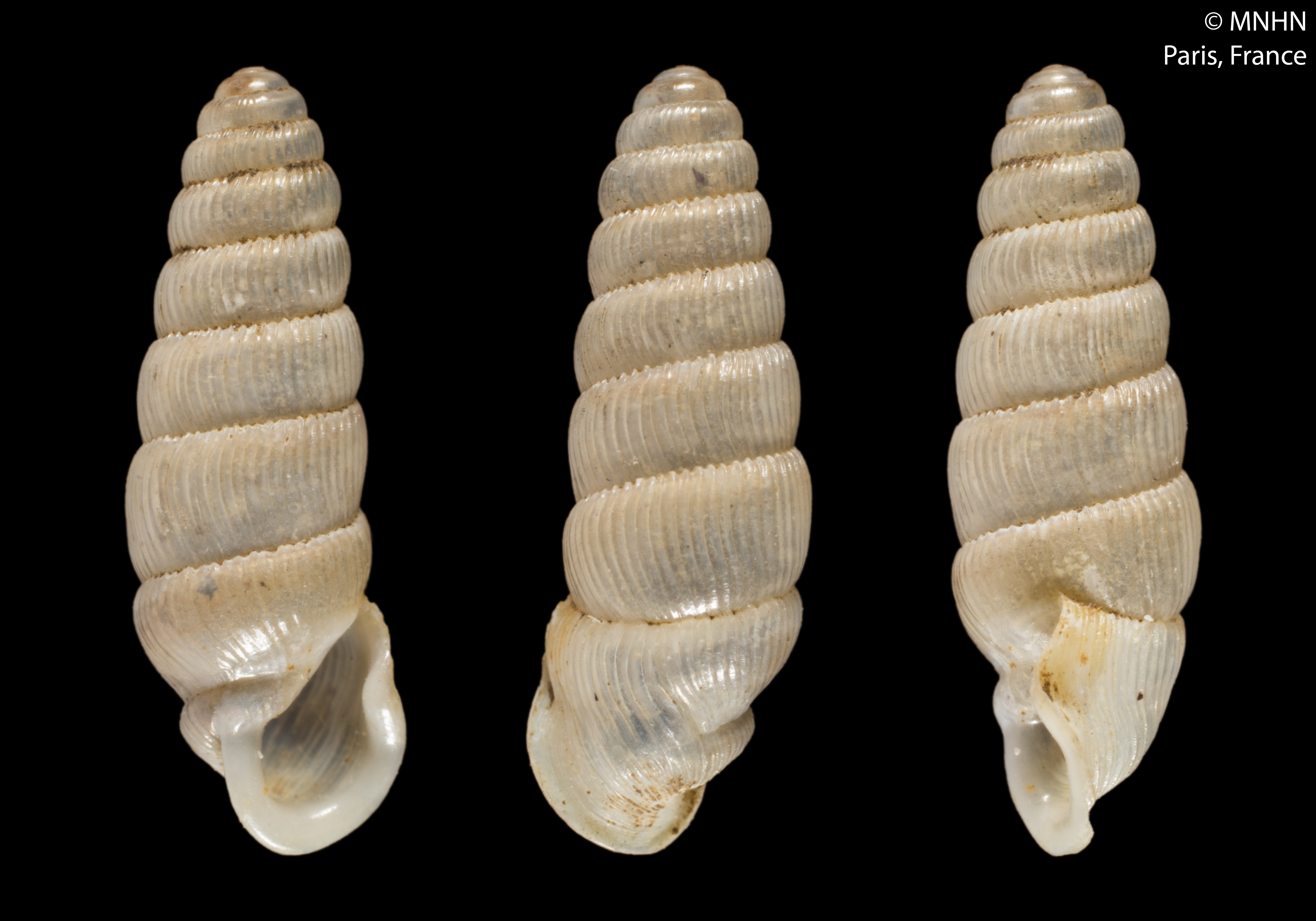
- Shell of Elma fultoni (syntype at MNHN, Paris)

Scientific classification
- Kingdom: Animalia
- Phylum: Mollusca
- Class: Gastropoda
- Order: Stylommatophora
- Family: Streptaxidae
- Genus: Elma; Adams, 1866

Type species
- Ennea swinhoei H. Adams, 1866

Diversity
- about 10 species

Synonyms
- Ennea (Elma) H. Adams, 1866 (original rank)

= Elma (gastropod) =

Genus of gastropods

Elma is a genus of air-breathing land snails, terrestrial pulmonate gastropod mollusks in the family Streptaxidae.

== Taxonomy ==
Elma was classified within the subfamily Enneinae. Páll-Gergely et al. (2015) classified Elma according to the first internal anatomy research of the genus either in Streptaxinae or in the Gibbinae.

== Distribution ==
The distribution of the genus Elma includes Taiwan, northern Vietnam and China.

== Species ==
Species within the genus Elma include:

- Elma fultoni (Bavay & Dautzenberg, 1912)
- Elma mansuyi (Dautzenberg & H. Fischer, 1906)
- Elma matskasii Varga, 2012
- Elma messageri (Bavay & Dautzenberg, 1904)
- Elma microstoma (Möllendorff, 1881)
- Elma mitis Heude, 1890
- Elma oblongata Yen, 1939
- Elma pachygyra (Gredler, 1885)
- Elma sinensis (Möllendorff, 1886)
- Elma swinhoei (H. Adams, 1866) - type species
  - Elma swinhoei hotawana (Pilsbry & Hirase, 1905)
- Elma tonkiniana (Bavay & Dautzenberg, 1904)

Synonyms

- Subgenus Elma (Fultonelma) F. Haas, 1951 : synonym of Pseudelma (Fultonelma) F. Haas, 1951 represented as Pseudelma Kobelt, 1904
- Elma (Fultonelma) bisexigua F. Haas, 1951: synonym of Pseudelma (Fultonelma) bisexigua (F. Haas, 1951) represented as Pseudelma bisexigua (F. Haas, 1951) (basionym)
- Elma bisexigua F. Haas, 1951: synonym of Pseudelma bisexigua (F. Haas, 1951) (original combination)
