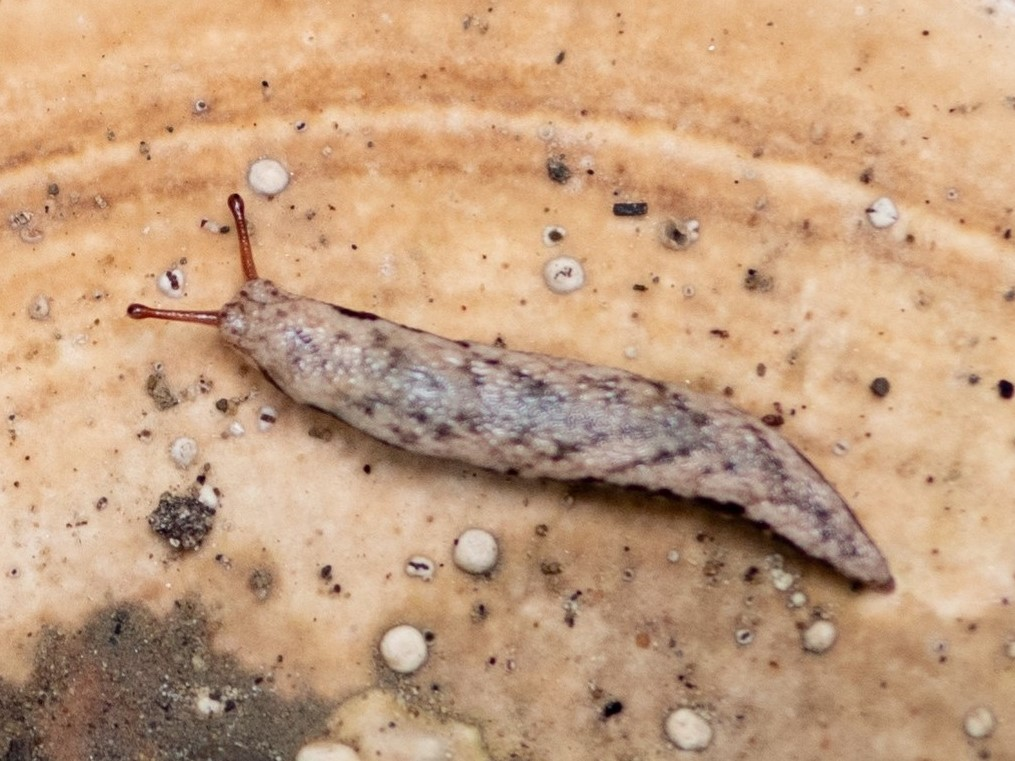

Scientific classification
- Domain: Eukaryota
- Kingdom: Animalia
- Phylum: Mollusca
- Class: Gastropoda
- Order: Stylommatophora
- Family: Philomycidae
- Genus: Meghimatium
- Species: M. burchi

Binomial name
- Meghimatium burchi Tsai & Wu, 2008

= Meghimatium burchi =

Species of gastropod

Meghimatium burchi is a species of small air-breathing land slug, a terrestrial pulmonate gastropod mollusc in the family Philomycidae and the superfamily Arionacea, the roundback slugs. The specific name burchi is in honor of the American malacologist John B. Burch.

== Description ==
A small species, its body length is around 12 to 16.5 mm.

== Distribution ==
The distribution of Meghimatium burchi includes Taiwan. The type locality is "watershed of Koan-Tau Mt. in Huei-Sun Agriculture Farm, Nantou County", Taiwan. The holotype is deposited at Taichung's National Museum of Natural Science.
