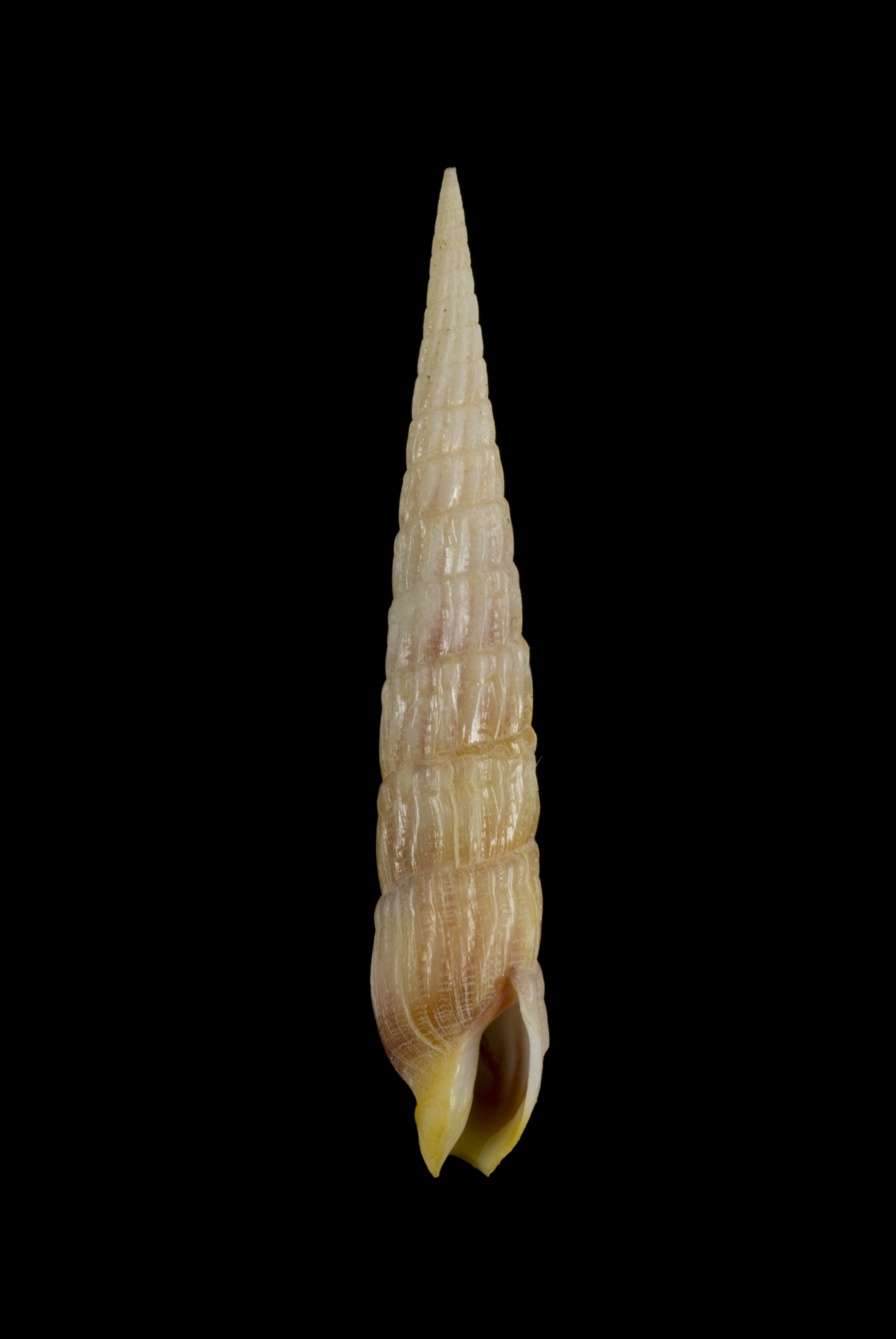
- Shell of Myurellopsis nathaliae (specimen at MNHN, Paris)

Scientific classification
- Kingdom: Animalia
- Phylum: Mollusca
- Class: Gastropoda
- Subclass: Caenogastropoda
- Order: Neogastropoda
- Family: Terebridae
- Genus: Myurellopsis
- Species: M. nathaliae

Binomial name
- Myurellopsis nathaliae (Drivas & Jay, 1988)

Synonyms
- Myurella nathaliae (Drivas & Jay, 1988); Terebra nathaliae Drivas & Jay, 1988 (original combination)

= Myurellopsis nathaliae =

Species of gastropod

Myurellopsis nathaliae is a species of sea snail, a marine gastropod mollusc in the family Terebridae, the auger snails.

== Distribution ==
This marine species occurs off Mozambique.
