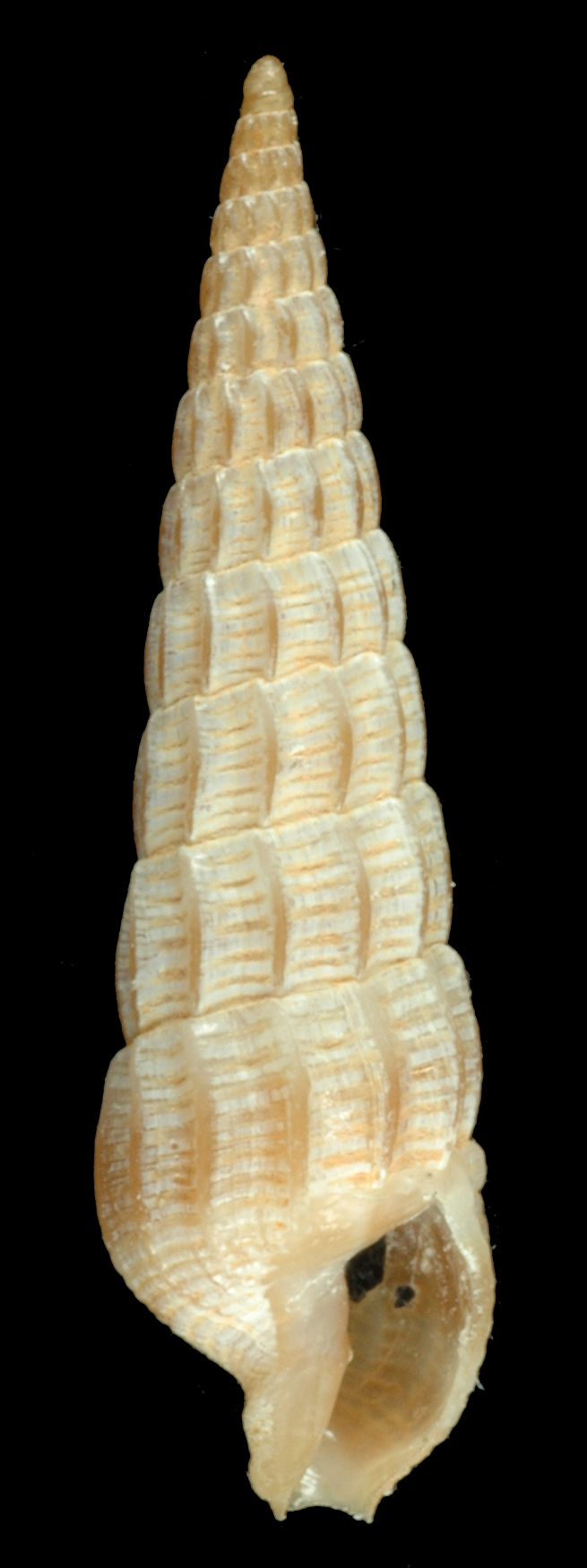
- Myurellopsis joserosadoi

Scientific classification
- Kingdom: Animalia
- Phylum: Mollusca
- Class: Gastropoda
- Subclass: Caenogastropoda
- Order: Neogastropoda
- Family: Terebridae
- Genus: Myurellopsis
- Species: M. joserosadoi

Binomial name
- Myurellopsis joserosadoi (Bozzetti 2001)

Synonyms
- Myurella joserosadoi (Bozzetti, 2001); Terebra joserosadoi Bozzetti, 2001 (original combination)

= Myurellopsis joserosadoi =

Species of gastropod

Myurellopsis joserosadoi is a species of sea snail, a marine gastropod mollusc in the family Terebridae, the auger snails.

== Distribution ==
This marine species occurs off Madagascar.
