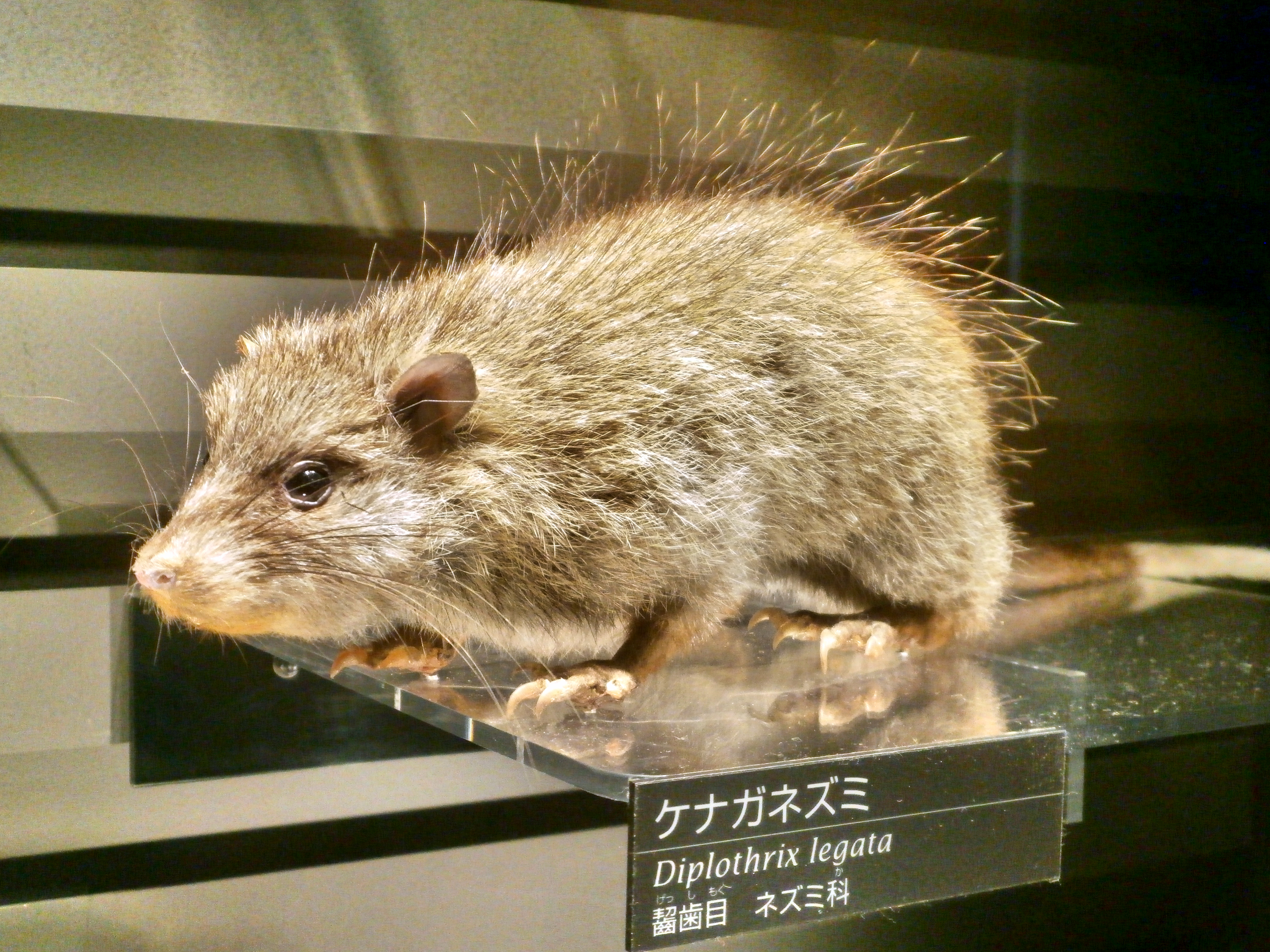
- Stuffed specimen of Diplothrix legata. Exhibit in the National Museum of Nature and Science, Tokyo, Japan.

Scientific classification
- Kingdom: Animalia
- Phylum: Chordata
- Class: Mammalia
- Infraclass: Placentalia
- Order: Rodentia
- Family: Muridae
- Tribe: Rattini
- Genus: Diplothrix; Thomas, 1916

Species
- Diplothrix legata; †Diplothrix yangziensis

= Diplothrix =

Diplothrix Temporal range: Early Pleistocene–Recent

Genus of rodents

Diplothrix is a genus of two species of rodents in the family Muridae. Diplothrix legata occurs in the Ryukyu Islands of Japan. Diplothrix yangziensis is known only from fossils collected in eastern China, dating to the Early Pleistocene.
