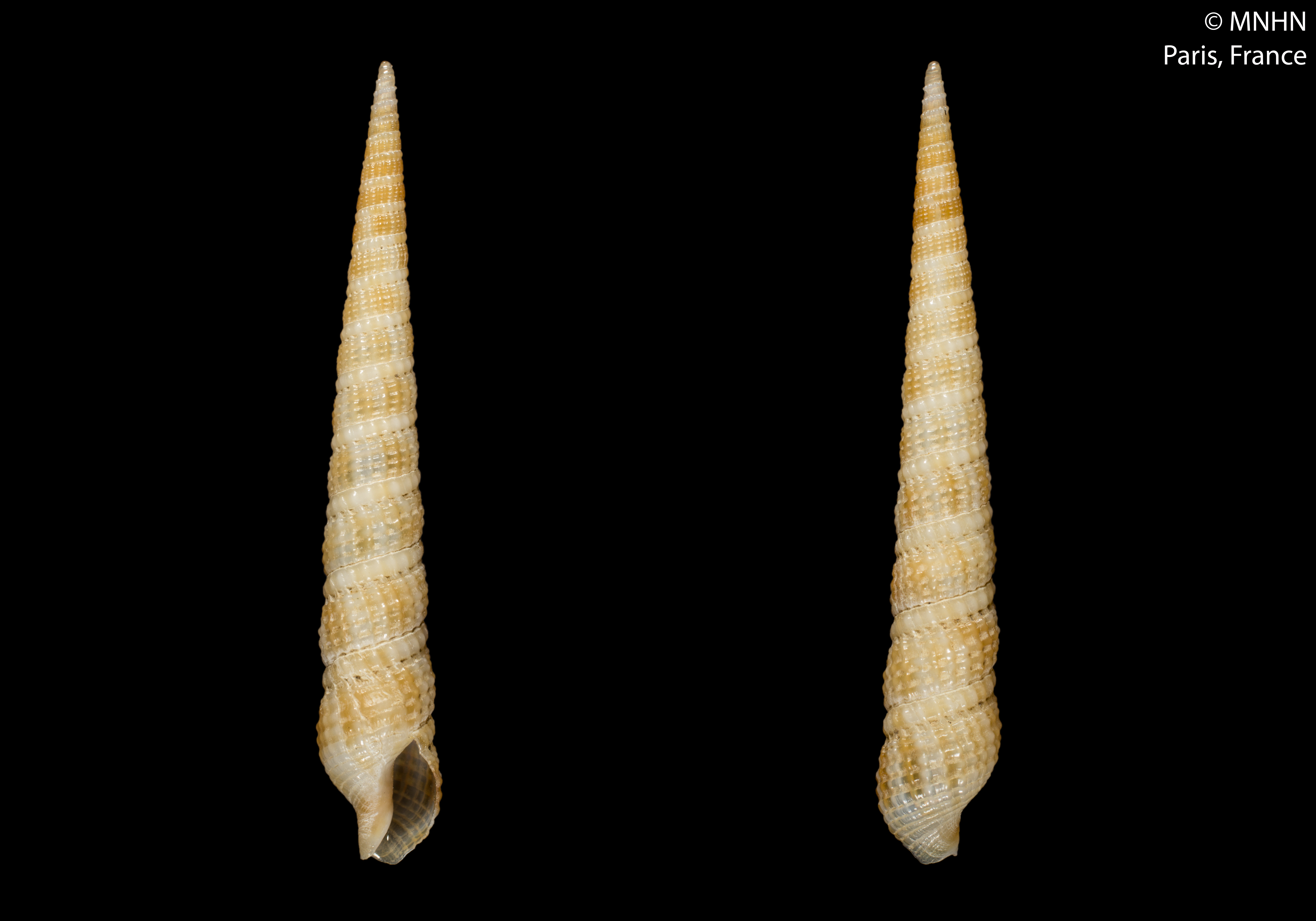
- Myurellopsis alisi

Scientific classification
- Kingdom: Animalia
- Phylum: Mollusca
- Class: Gastropoda
- Subclass: Caenogastropoda
- Order: Neogastropoda
- Family: Terebridae
- Genus: Myurellopsis; Fedosov, Malcolm, Terryn, Gorson, Modica, Holford & Puillandre, 2020

Type species
- Terebra undulata Gray, 1834

= Myurellopsis =

Genus of gastropods

Myurellopsis is a genus of marine snails, gastropod mollusks in the family Terebridae, subfamily Terebrinae.

== Species ==
Species within the genus Myurellopsis include:

- Myurellopsis alisi (Aubry, 1999)
- Myurellopsis columellaris (Hinds, 1844)
- Myurellopsis guphilae (Poppe, Tagaro & Terryn, 2009)
- Myurellopsis joserosadoi (Bozzetti, 2001)
- Myurellopsis kilburni (R. D. Burch, 1965)
- Myurellopsis monicae (Terryn, 2005)
- Myurellopsis nathaliae (Drivas & Jay, 1988)
- Myurellopsis parkinsoni (Bratcher & Cernohorsky, 1976)
- Myurellopsis paucistriata (E. A. Smith, 1873)
- Myurellopsis undulata (Gray, 1834)
- Myurellopsis vaubani (Aubry, 1999)
