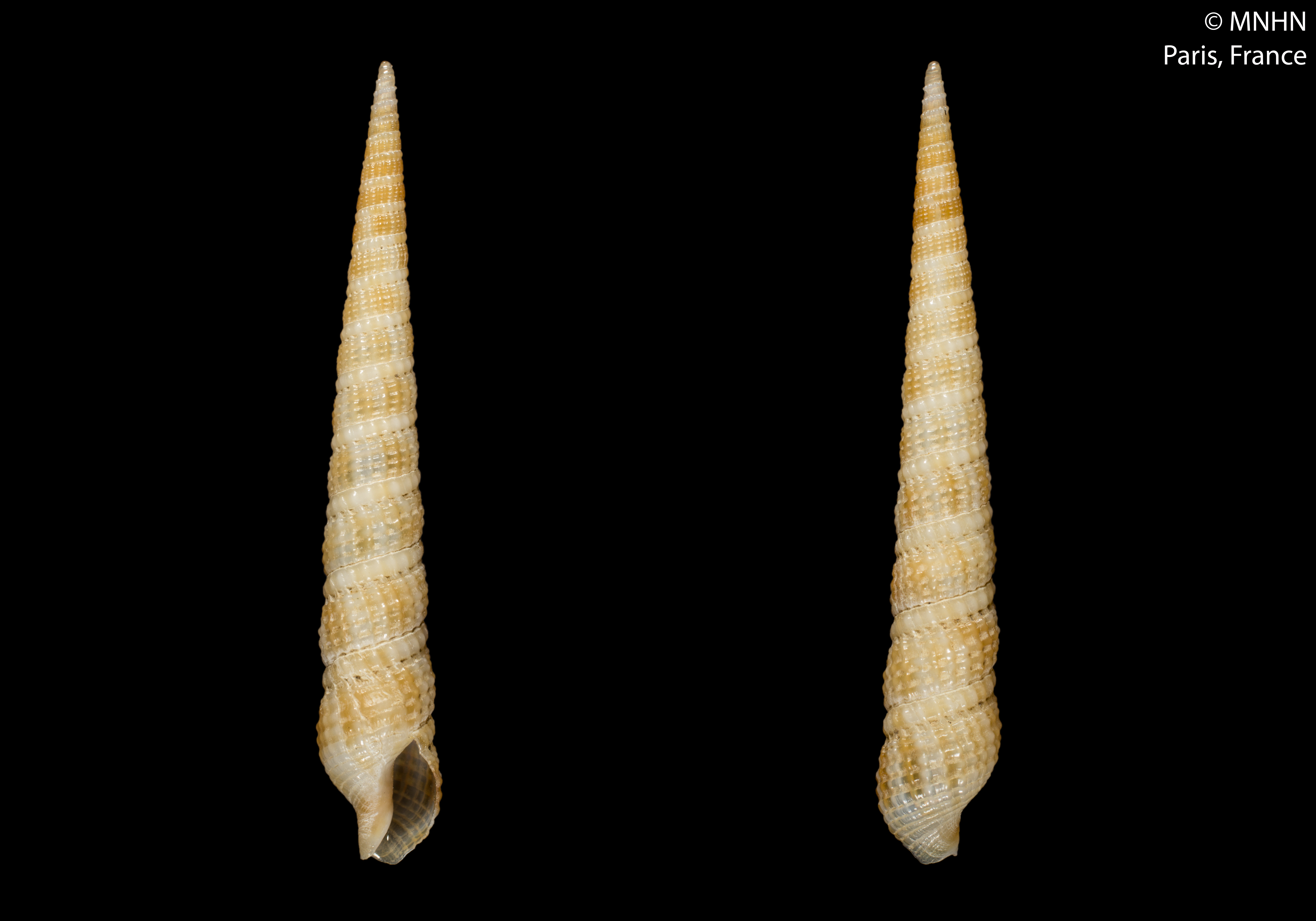
- Shell of Myurellopsis alisi (holotype at MNHN, Paris)

Scientific classification
- Kingdom: Animalia
- Phylum: Mollusca
- Class: Gastropoda
- Subclass: Caenogastropoda
- Order: Neogastropoda
- Family: Terebridae
- Genus: Myurellopsis
- Species: M. alisi

Binomial name
- Myurellopsis alisi (Aubry, 1999)

Synonyms
- Terebra alisi Aubry, 1999 (original combination)

= Myurellopsis alisi =

Species of gastropod

Myurellopsis alisi is a species of sea snail, a marine gastropod mollusc in the family Terebridae, the auger snails.

== Distribution ==
This marine species occurs off Vanuatu.
