= Acusta ravida =

Scientific classification
- Kingdom: Animalia
- Phylum: Mollusca
- Class: Gastropoda
- Order: Stylommatophora
- Family: Camaenidae
- Genus: Acusta
- Species: A. ravida

Binomial name
- Acusta ravida (Benson, 1842)

Synonyms
- Bradybaena ravida (Benson, 1842); Eulota (Acusta) ravida (Benson, 1842); Helix ravida Benson, 1842; Nanina ravida Benson, 1842

Species of air-breathing land snail

Acusta ravida is a species of air-breathing land snail in the family Camaenidae native to eastern Asia.

== Subspecies ==
Three subspecies are recognized:

- Acusta ravida burtini (Deshayes, 1874)
- Acusta ravida frilleyi (Crosse & Debeaux, 1863)
- Acusta ravida ravidella (Möllendorff, 1899)
- Acusta ravida lineolata (Möllendorff, 1875): synonym of Acusta lineolata (Möllendorff, 1875) (unaccepted rank)
- Acusta ravida ravidula (Heude, 1882): synonym of Bradybaena ravidula (Heude, 1882) (unaccepted combination and rank)
- Acusta ravida redfieldi (L. Pfeiffer, 1852): synonym of Acusta redfieldi (L. Pfeiffer, 1852) (unaccepted rank)
