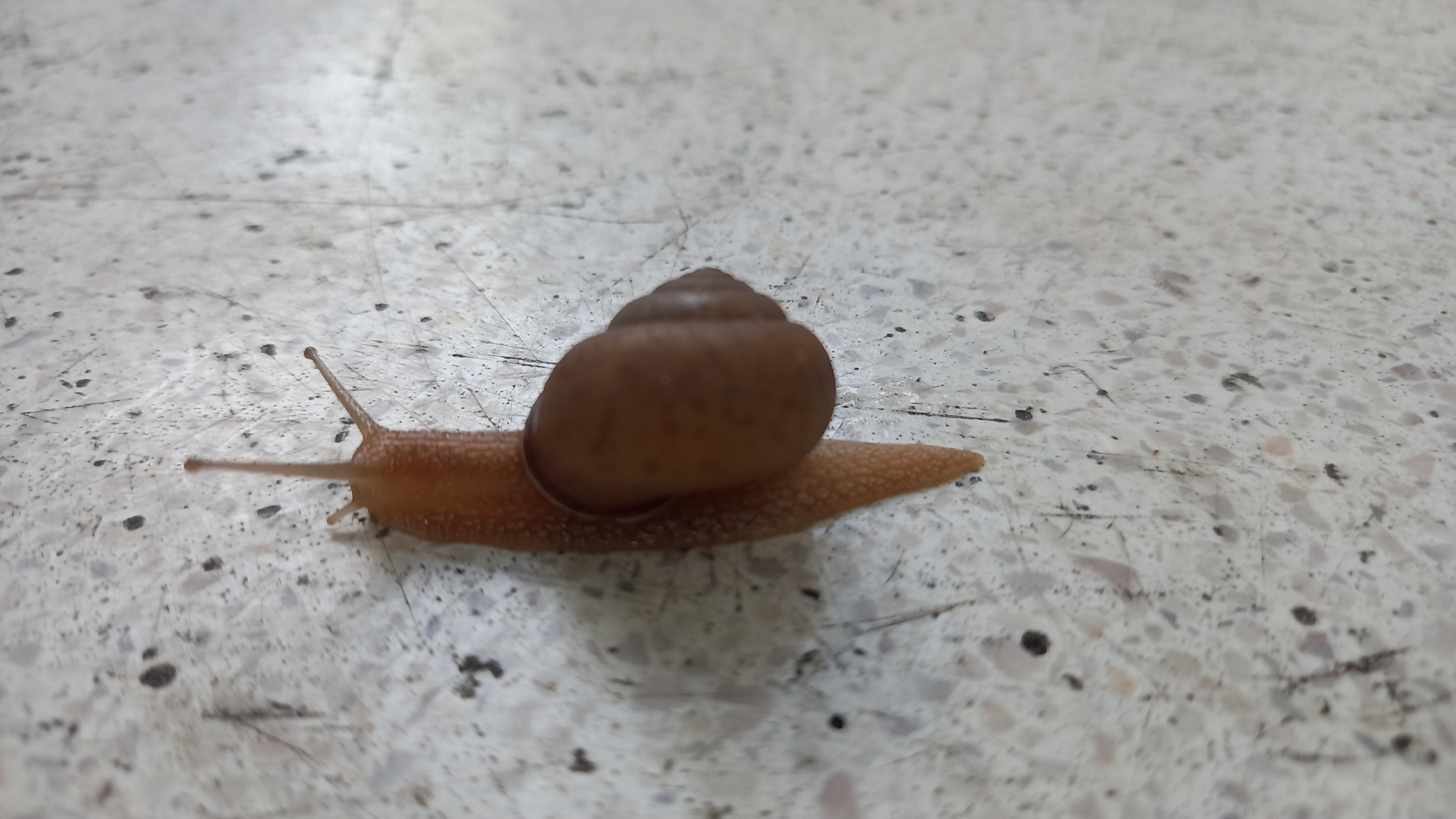

Scientific classification
- Domain: Eukaryota
- Kingdom: Animalia
- Phylum: Mollusca
- Class: Gastropoda
- Order: Stylommatophora
- Family: Camaenidae
- Genus: Acusta
- Species: A. tourannensis

Binomial name
- Acusta tourannensis (Souleyet, 1842)

= Acusta tourannensis =

Species of gastropod

Acusta tourannensis is a species of air-breathing land snail, a terrestrial pulmonate gastropod mollusc in the family Camaenidae.

== Distribution ==
The distribution of this species includes:

- Pratas Island, Taiwan
- Japan

This species has not yet become established in the US, but it is considered to represent a potentially serious threat as a pest, an invasive species which could negatively affect agriculture, natural ecosystems, human health or commerce. Therefore, it has been suggested that this species be given top national quarantine significance in the USA.
