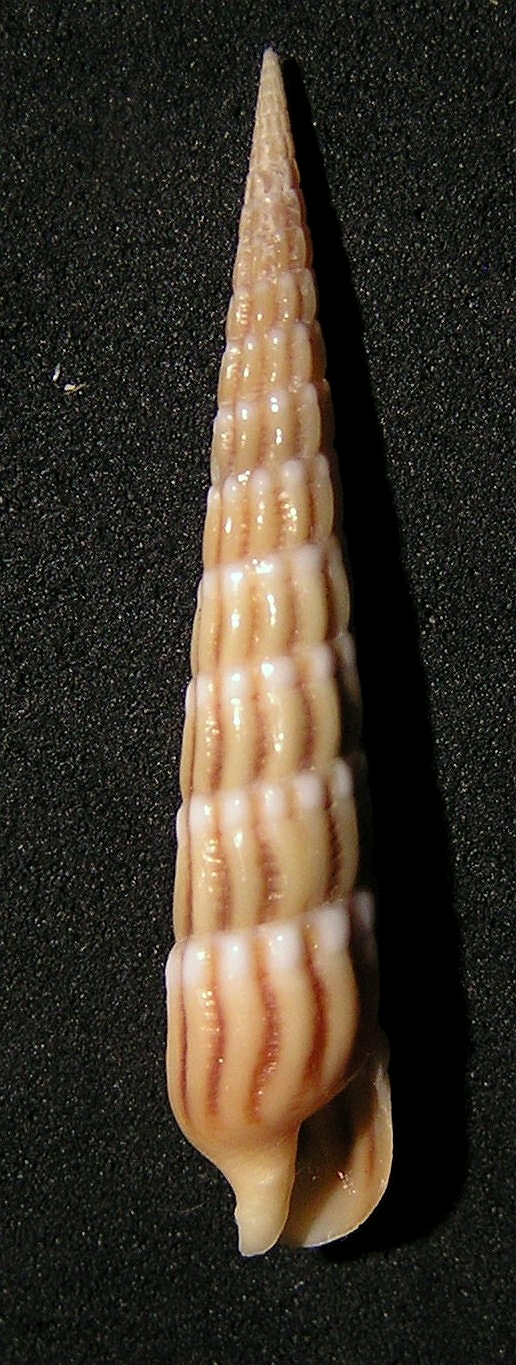
- Apertural view of a shell of Myurellopsis undulata

Scientific classification
- Kingdom: Animalia
- Phylum: Mollusca
- Class: Gastropoda
- Subclass: Caenogastropoda
- Order: Neogastropoda
- Family: Terebridae
- Genus: Myurellopsis
- Species: M. undulata

Binomial name
- Myurellopsis undulata (Gray, 1834)

Synonyms
- Myurella undulata (Gray, 1834); Terebra undulata Gray, 1834; Terebra undulata var. laevior Schepman, 1913

= Myurellopsis undulata =

Species of gastropod

Myurellopsis undulata, common name the undulate auger, is a species of sea snail, a marine gastropod mollusc in the family Terebridae, the auger snails.

== Description ==
The length of the shell varies between 25 mm and 60 mm.

== Distribution ==
This marine species occurs in the Persian Gulf, in the Indian Ocean off Madagascar, Aldabra and Chagos; in the Pacific Ocean off New Guinea, Hawaii and Fiji.
