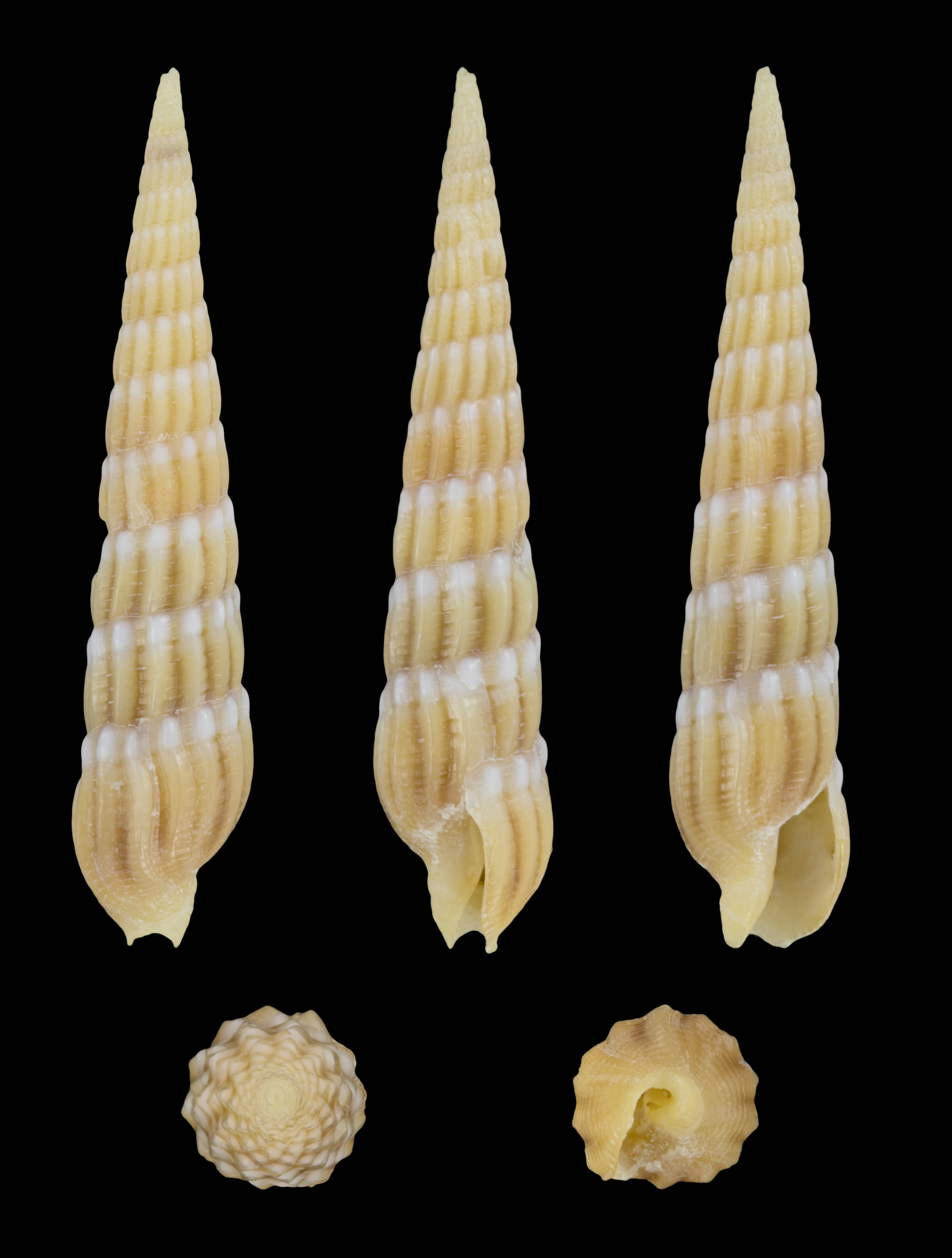
- Myurellopsis parkinsoni

Scientific classification
- Kingdom: Animalia
- Phylum: Mollusca
- Class: Gastropoda
- Subclass: Caenogastropoda
- Order: Neogastropoda
- Family: Terebridae
- Genus: Myurellopsis
- Species: M. parkinsoni

Binomial name
- Myurellopsis parkinsoni (Cernohorsky & Bratcher, 1976)

Synonyms
- Myurella parkinsoni (Bratcher & Cernohorsky, 1976); Terebra parkinsoni Cernohorsky & Bratcher, 1976

= Myurellopsis parkinsoni =

Species of gastropod

Myurellopsis parkinsoni is a species of sea snail, a marine gastropod mollusc in the family Terebridae, the auger snails.

== Description ==
The length of the shell varies between 25 mm and 52 mm.

== Distribution ==
This species occurs in the Red Sea, in the Indian Ocean off East Africa and the Mascarene Basin; in the Pacific Ocean off Fiji and the Philippines.
