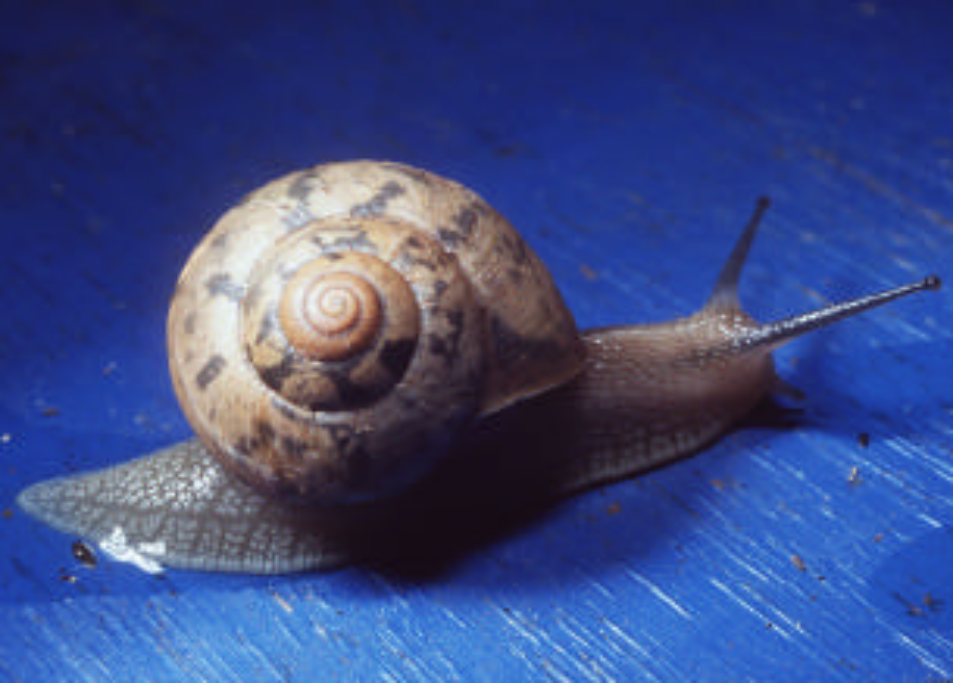
- Acusta despecta

Scientific classification
- Kingdom: Animalia
- Phylum: Mollusca
- Class: Gastropoda
- Order: Stylommatophora
- Family: Camaenidae
- Subfamily: Bradybaeninae
- Tribe: Bradybaenini
- Genus: Acusta; Albers, 1860

Type species
- Nanina ravida Benson, 1842

Synonyms
- Eulota (Acusta) Martens, 1860 (unaccepted rank); Helix (Acusta) Martens, 1860; Manchurohelix Taki, 1936; Nanina (Acusta) Albers, 1860

= Acusta =

Genus of gastropods

Acusta is a genus of air-breathing land snails, terrestrial pulmonate gastropod molluscs in the subfamily Bradybaeninae of the family Camaenidae.

== Species ==
Species within the genus Acusta include:

- Acusta assimilis (H. Adams, 1866)
- Acusta despecta (G. B. Sowerby I, 1839)
- Acusta lineolata (Möllendorff, 1875)
- Acusta moolenbeeki Thach & F. Huber, 2021
- Acusta ravida (Benson, 1842)
- Acusta redfieldi (L. Pfeiffer, 1852)
- Acusta rhodostoma (Möllendorff, 1884)
- Acusta sieboldtiana (L. Pfeiffer, 1850)
- Acusta tourannensis (Souleyet, 1852)
- Acusta toyenmongaiensis Rolle, 1911

Species brought into synonymy

- Acusta frilleyi (Crosse & Debeaux, 1863): synonym of Acusta ravida frilleyi (Crosse & Debeaux, 1863) (unaccepted rank)
- Acusta kikaiensis (Pilsbry, 1902): synonym of Acusta despecta kikaiensis (Pilsbry, 1902)
- Acusta laeta (Gould, 1859): synonym of Ezohelix gainesi (Pilsbry, 1900) (junior synonym)
- Acusta vagoina (Gredler, 1887) : synonym of Bradybaena vagoina (Gredler, 1887) (superseded combination)
