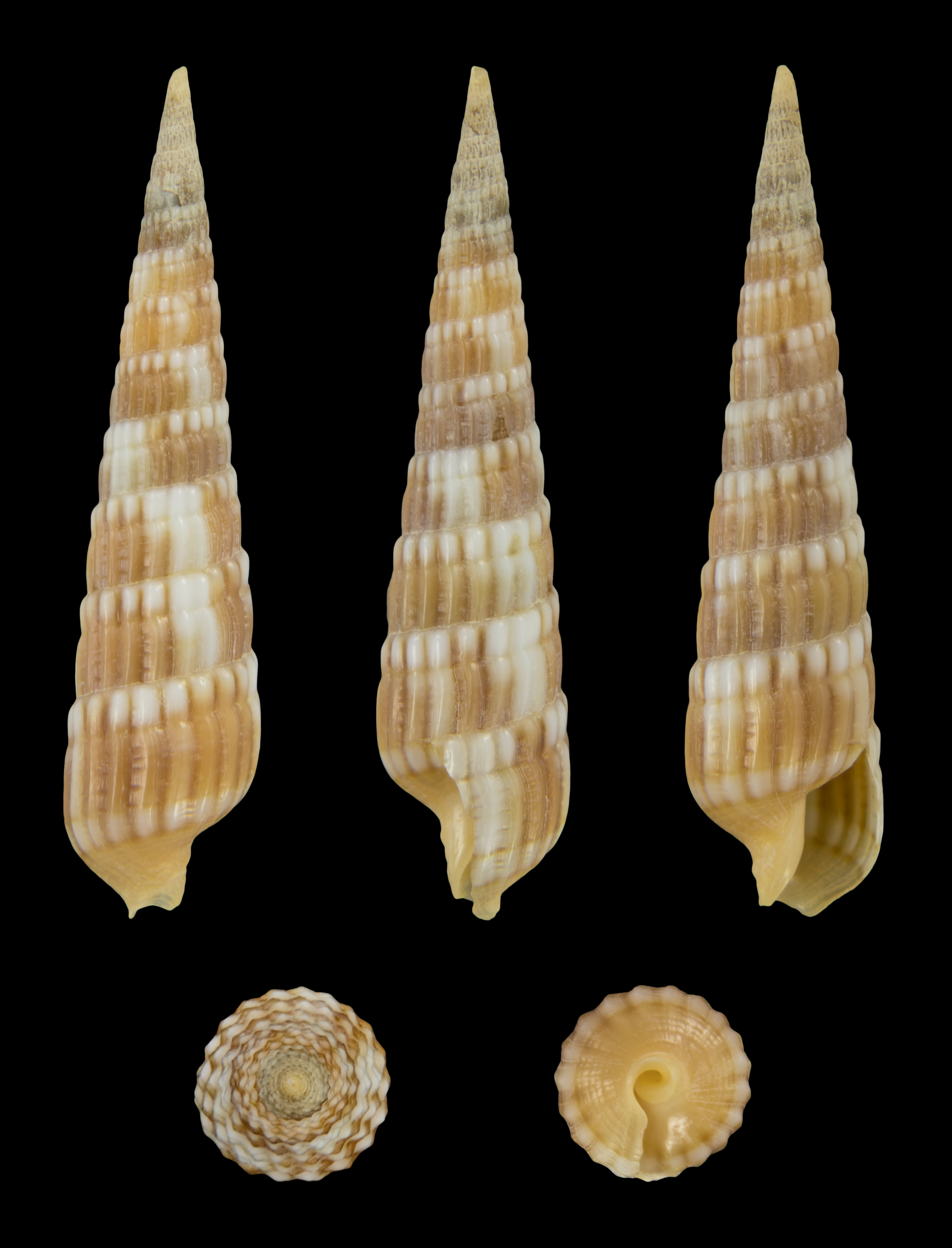
- Shell of Myurellopsis columellaris

Scientific classification
- Kingdom: Animalia
- Phylum: Mollusca
- Class: Gastropoda
- Subclass: Caenogastropoda
- Order: Neogastropoda
- Family: Terebridae
- Genus: Myurellopsis
- Species: M. columellaris

Binomial name
- Myurellopsis columellaris (Hinds, 1844)

Synonyms
- Decorihastula columellaris (Hinds, 1844); Myurella columellaris (Hinds, 1844); Terebra carnicolor Preston, 1908; Terebra columellaris Hinds, 1844

= Myurellopsis columellaris =

Species of gastropod

Myurellopsis columellaris is a species of sea snail, a marine gastropod mollusc in the family Terebridae, the auger snails.

== Description ==
The length of the shell varies between 20 mm and 53 mm.

(Original description) The subulate shell has a pale flesh colour. It is polished and shining. It contains 15 whorls. These are sculptured with closely set longitudinal costae, crossed near the upper end by a slight spiral groove, thus forming an infra-sutural crenate band. The interstices between the costae are spirally punctate. The punctations of the upper row are coarser than the rest. The small aperture is narrow. The columella descends rather obliquely. The peristome is simple. The base of the shell is marked with three revolving punctate grooves.

== Distribution ==
This marine species occurs in the Red Sea, the Indian Ocean off Madagascar, Aldabra and the Mascarene Basin; also off the Andaman Islands and Fiji.
