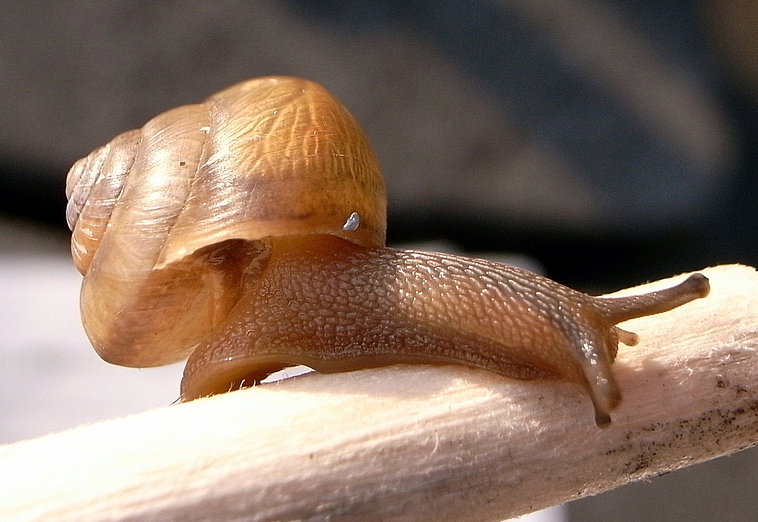
- A live individual of Acusta despecta sieboldiana
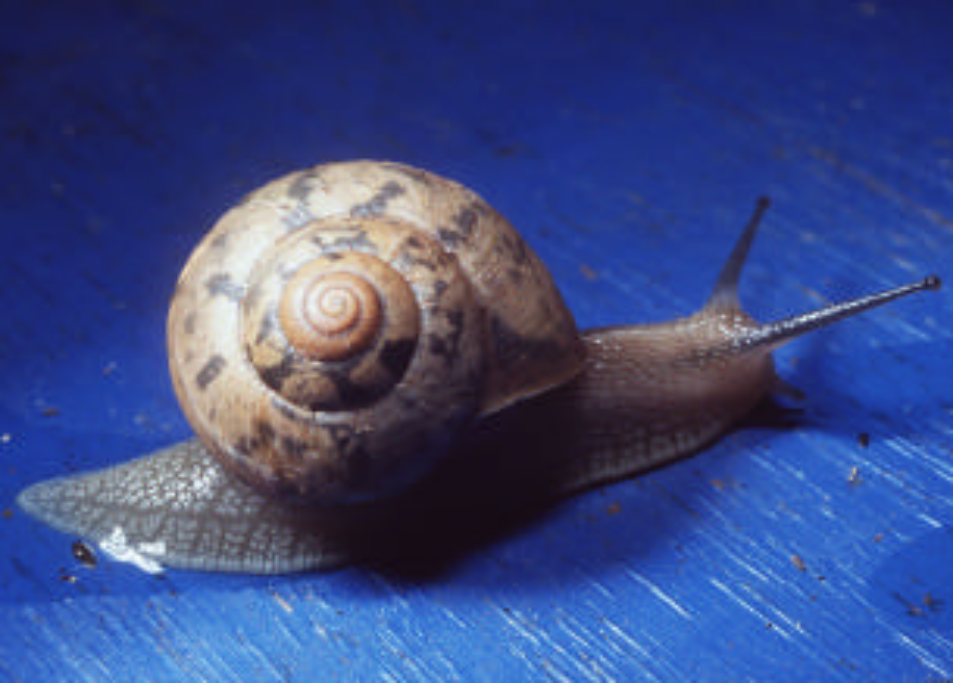
- A live individual of Acusta despecta

Scientific classification
- Kingdom: Animalia
- Phylum: Mollusca
- Class: Gastropoda
- Order: Stylommatophora
- Family: Camaenidae
- Genus: Acusta
- Species: A. despecta

Binomial name
- Acusta despecta (G.B. Sowerby I, 1839)
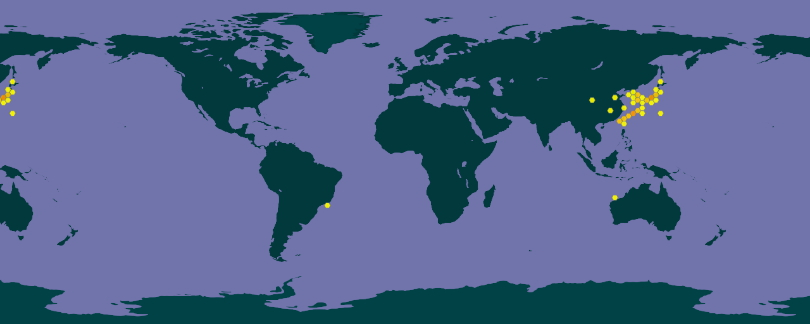

Synonyms
- Bradybaena despecta (Gray, 1839) (original combination); Eulota (Acusta) despecta (G. B. Sowerby I, 1839) (unaccepted combination); Eulota despecta (G. B. Sowerby I, 1839) (unaccepted combination); Helix despecta G. B. Sowerby I, 1839 (original combination)

= Acusta despecta =

Species of gastropod

Acusta despecta is a species of air-breathing land snail, a terrestrial pulmonate gastropod mollusc in the family Camaenidae.

This species is sometimes a pest on citrus trees.

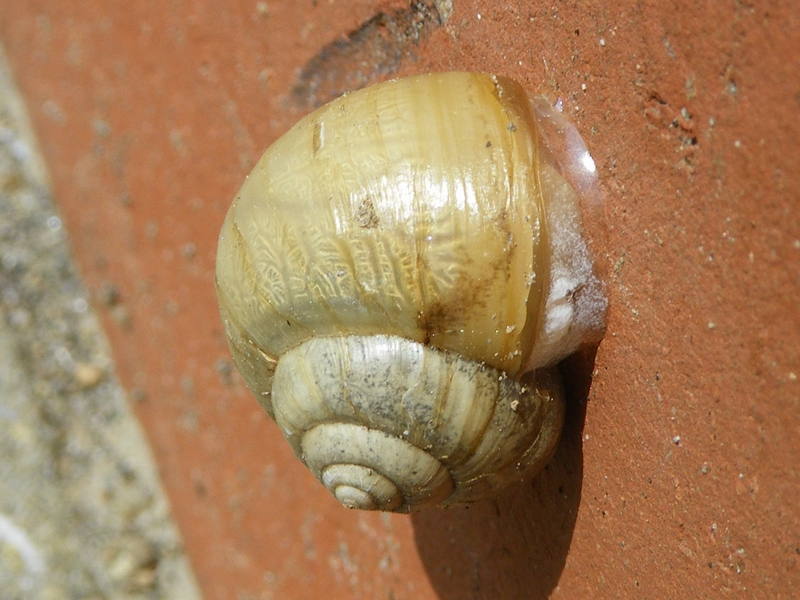
A resting Acusta despecta sieboldiana is attached to a wall, having formed an epiphragm

== Subspecies ==
- Acusta despecta chinensis
- Acusta despecta ikiensis (Pilsbry & Hirase, 1904)
- Acusta despecta kikaiensis (Pilsbry, 1902)
- Acusta despecta praetenuis (Pilsbry & Hirase, 1904)
- Acusta despecta sieboldiana in korean: 달팽이
- Acusta despecta sieboldtiana (Pfeiffer, 1850) - in Japanese: ウスカワマイマイ

== Distribution ==
The distribution of this species includes:

- Japan
- Guam
- South Korea
