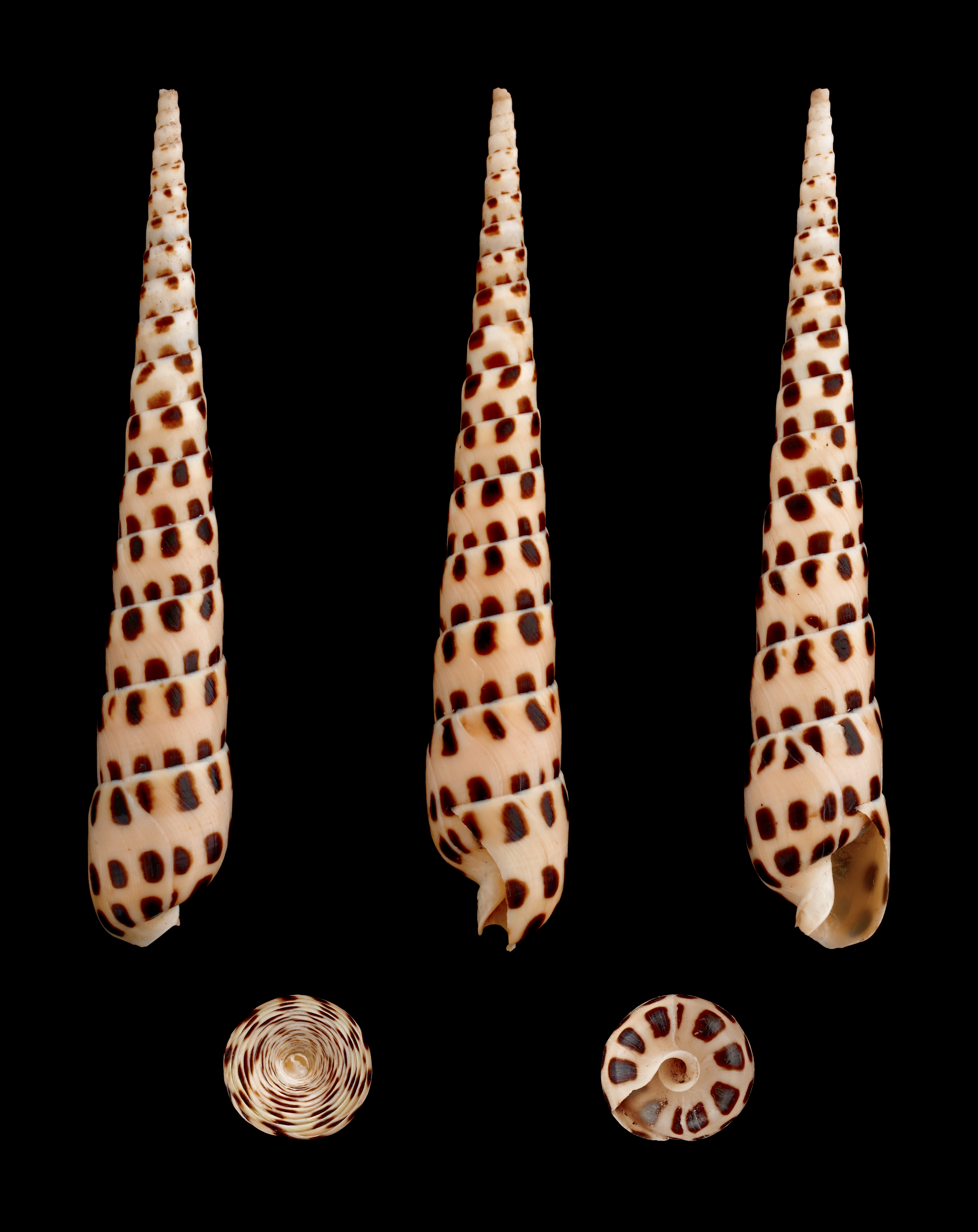
- Shells of Terebra subulata

Scientific classification
- Kingdom: Animalia
- Phylum: Mollusca
- Class: Gastropoda
- Subclass: Caenogastropoda
- Order: Neogastropoda
- Family: Terebridae
- Genus: Terebra
- Species: T. subulata

Binomial name
- Terebra subulata (Linnaeus, 1758)

Synonyms
- Buccinum subulatum Linnaeus, 1767 (original combination); Terebra fusca Perry, 1811; Terebrum tigreum Montfort, 1810; Vertagus subulatus (Linnaeus, 1767)

= Terebra subulata =

Species of gastropod

Terebra subulata is a species of sea snail, a marine gastropod mollusk in the family Terebridae, the auger snails.

== Description ==
Shells of Terebra subulata can reach a length of 115 mm (4.5 in) and a width of 16 mm (0.63 in). They have about 25 well-rounded whorls and a pointed spire. The aperture is very small and the outer lip is thin. The columella is twisted and the fasciole small. The anterior canal is truncated and curved. The shell is sculptured with fine axial threads and irregular weak spiral grooves, and the area below the suture raised into a spiral band. The color of the shell is cream with two rows of dark brown square blotches on the early whorls and three rows on the body whorl.

== Distribution and habitat ==
This species can be found from the coast of East Africa and Madagascar to Eastern Polynesia, Japan, Hawaii, and Australia, at depth of 0 to 10 m.

== Diet ==
Terebra subulata feeds on sand-dwelling Polychaeta and Enteropneusta. The prey is stung with the snail's radula teeth and paralysed by a venom, which is toxic to annelids and nematodes, but harmless to vertebrates.
