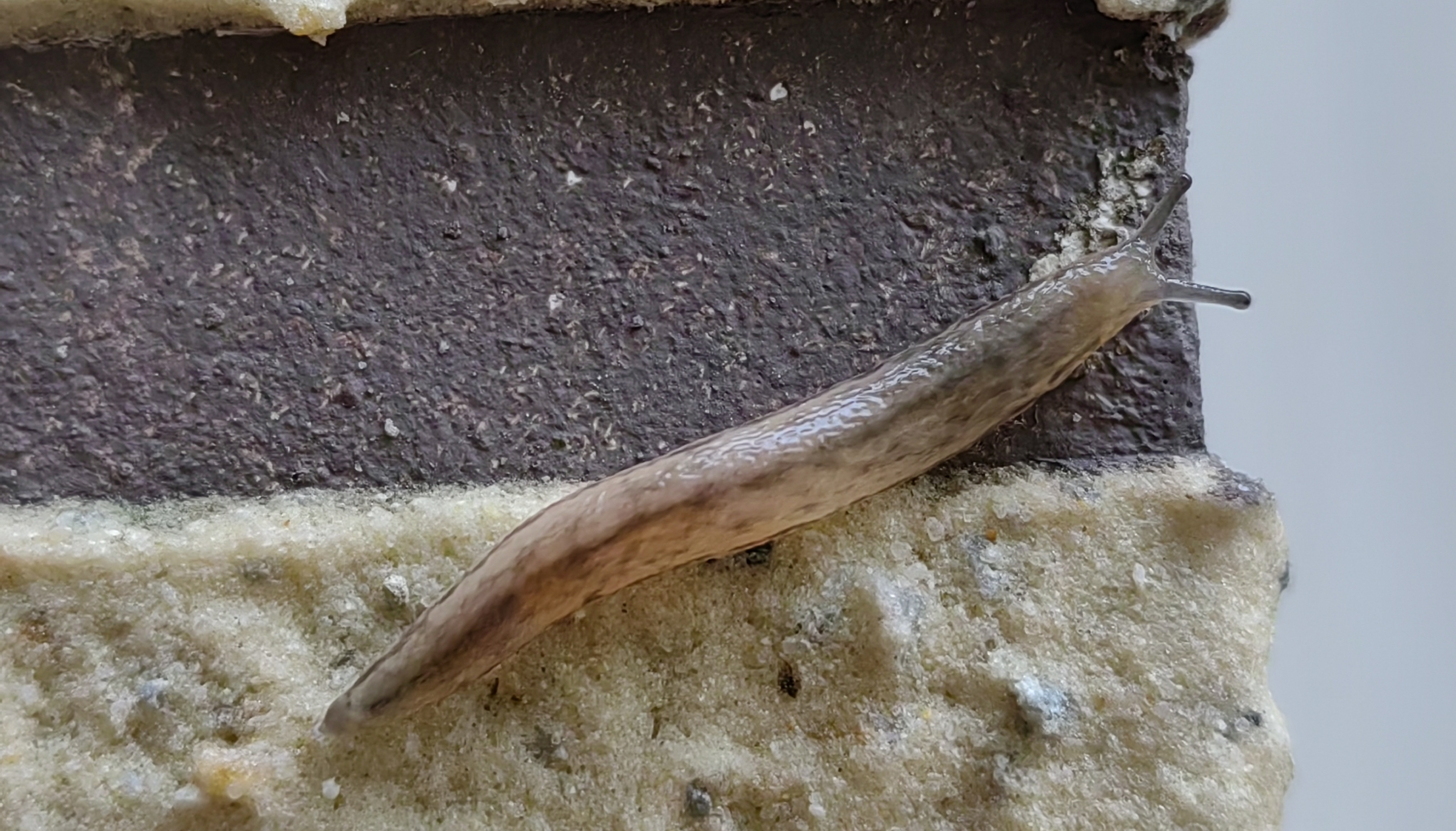

Scientific classification
- Kingdom: Animalia
- Phylum: Mollusca
- Class: Gastropoda
- Order: Stylommatophora
- Family: Philomycidae
- Genus: Meghimatium
- Species: M. bilineatum

Binomial name
- Meghimatium bilineatum (Benson, 1842)

= Meghimatium bilineatum =

Species of gastropod

Meghimatium bilineatum is a species of gastropod belonging to the family Philomycidae.

The species is found in Asia.
