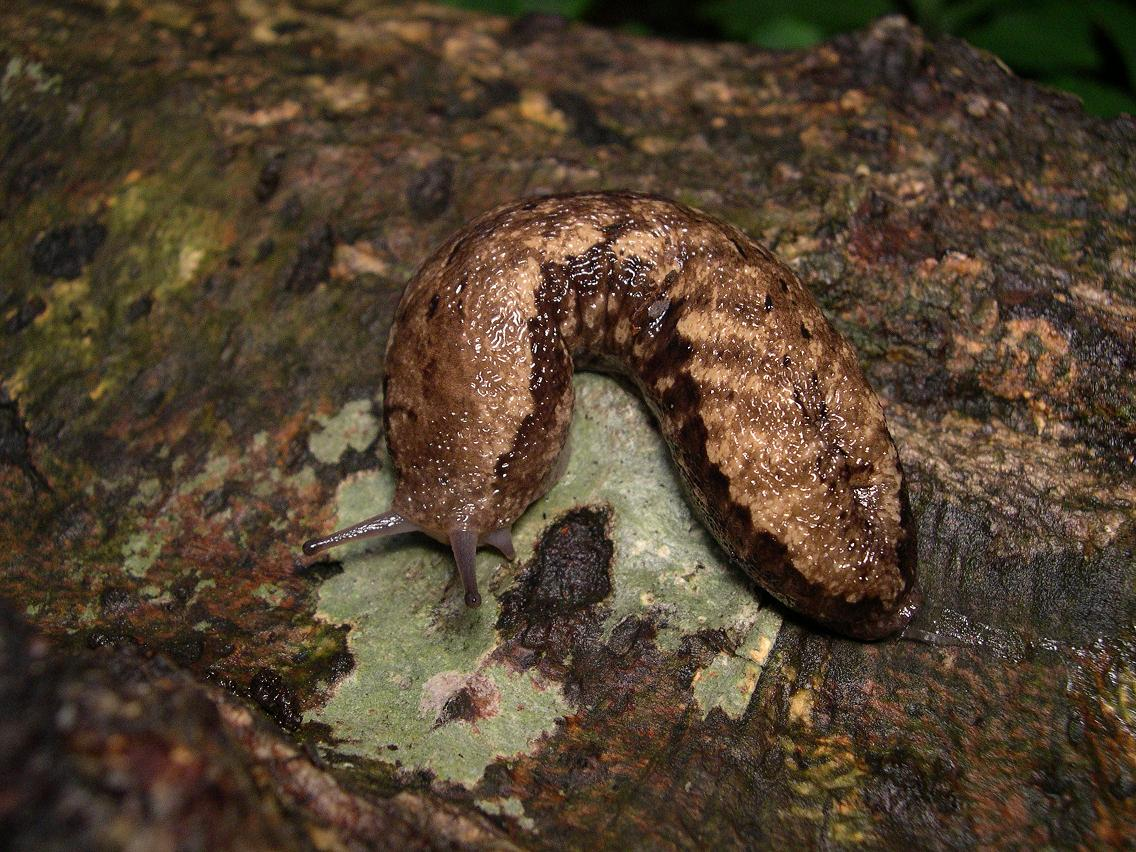
- Meghimatium fruhstorferi

Scientific classification
- Kingdom: Animalia
- Phylum: Mollusca
- Class: Gastropoda
- Order: Stylommatophora
- Family: Philomycidae
- Genus: Meghimatium; Hasselt, 1823

= Meghimatium =

Genus of gastropods

Meghimatium is a genus of medium to large air-breathing land slugs, terrestrial pulmonate gastropod mollusks in the family Philomycidae and the superfamily Arionoidea, the roundback slugs.

== Species ==
Species within the genus Meghimatium include:

- Meghimatium burchi Tsai & Wu, 2008 — from Taiwan
- Meghimatium bilineatum (Benson, 1842)
- Meghimatium fruhstorferi (Collinge, 1901)
- Meghimatium pictum (Stoliczka, 1873)
- Meghimatium rugosum (Chen & Gao, 1982)
- Meghimatium baoshanense Tsai, Lu & Kao, 2011
- Meghimatium hongdoensis Park, 2021
- Meghimatium striatum Hasselt, 1824 — from Java
- Meghimatium uniforme Laidlaw, 1937 — from North Borneo
