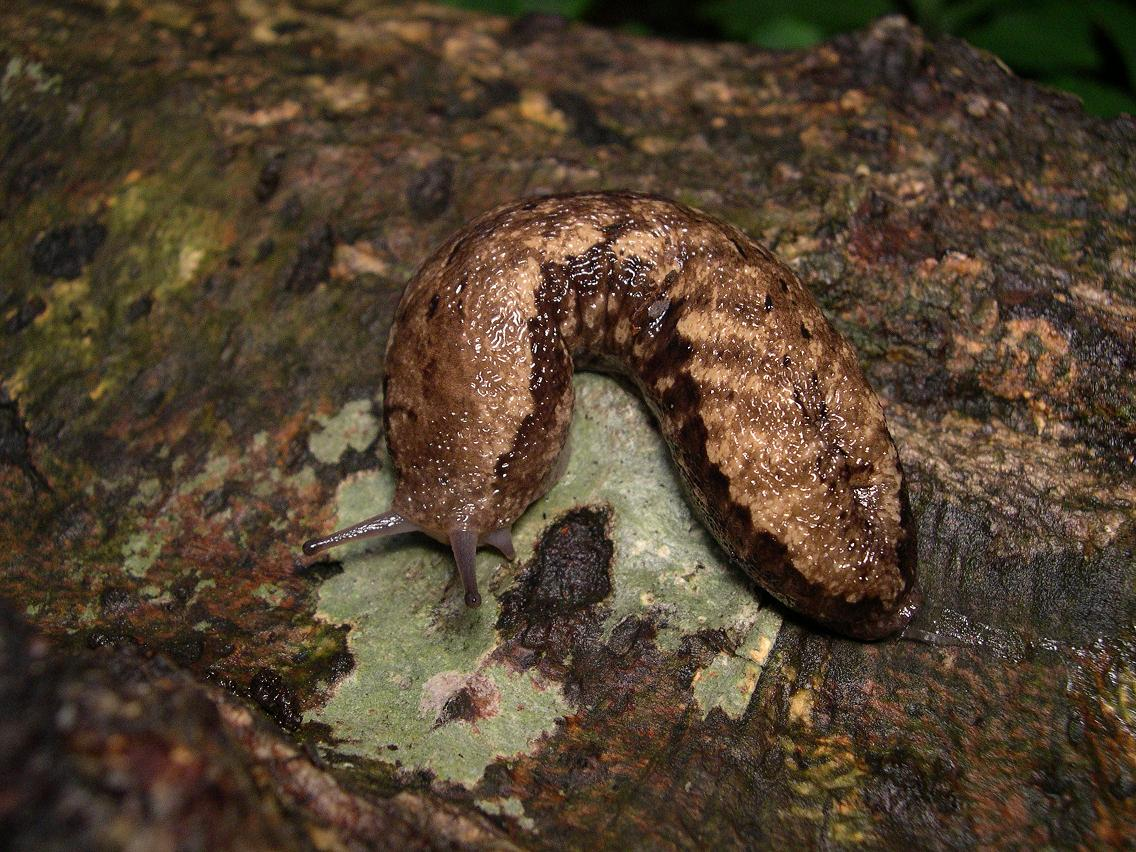

Scientific classification
- Kingdom: Animalia
- Phylum: Mollusca
- Class: Gastropoda
- Order: Stylommatophora
- Family: Philomycidae
- Genus: Meghimatium
- Species: M. fruhstorferi

Binomial name
- Meghimatium fruhstorferi (Collinge, 1901)

Synonyms
- Meghimatium melachloros Simroth, 1903; Philomycus (Meghimatium) fruhstorferi (Collinge, 1901); Incilaria fruhstorferi

= Meghimatium fruhstorferi =

Species of gastropod

Meghimatium fruhstorferi is a species of medium to large air-breathing land slug, a terrestrial pulmonate gastropod mollusc in the family Philomycidae and the superfamily Arionacea, the roundback slugs.

== Distribution ==
Its distribution is Korea,Japan and Taiwan.

Subspecies:

- Meghimatium fruhstorferi daiseniana (Cockerell)

== image ==

Meghimatium fruhstorferi sleeps.
