= John B. Burch =

American zoologist (1929–2021)

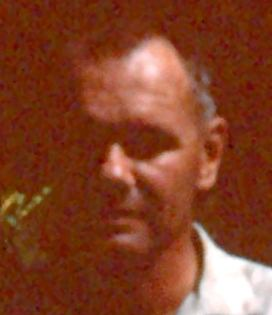
Burch in 1967

John Bayard Burch (August 12, 1929 – June 3, 2021) was an American zoologist, a biology professor at the University of Michigan, and the Curator of Mollusks at the University of Michigan Museum of Zoology. His research interests were broad, and encompassed not only the anatomy, systematics, and genetics of mollusks, but also various aspects of zoogeography and parasitology. He engaged in extensive fieldwork around the world, usually collecting mollusks, especially freshwater and terrestrial species. Some samples taken in Tahiti in 1970 have proven to be of importance in efforts to conserve vanishing kinds of the land snail Partula.

He was a son of biologist Paul Randolph Burch (1898–1958; U.S.A.).

Among other awards, Burch received the Freshwater Mollusk Conservation Society's "Lifetime Achievement Award", and the "John B. Burch Student Scholarship" of the Malacological Society of the Philippines was named in his honor.

Burch was Associate Editor of the malacological journal Malacologia.

== Taxa named in his honor ==
- Meghimatium burchi Tsai & Wu, 2008

== Bibliography ==
- (1960). Some snails and slugs of quarantine significance to the United States. U.S. Dept. Agriculture, Agricultural Research Service 82(1): 73 pp.
- (1962). How to Know the Eastern Land Snails. Wm. C. Brown Pub. 214 pp.
- Freshwater unionacean clams (Mollusca: Pelecypoda) of North America. Biota of Freshwater Ecosystems, Identification Manual No. 11. U.S. Gov. Printing Office. 114 p.
- (1992). "Freshwater snails of the University of Michigan Biological Station Area". Walkeriana 6(15). (with Younghun Jung)
- (1998). Bivalvia I. 145pp. Soc. Experimental and Descriptive Malacology. (editor, with William H. Heard)]
- (2007). Tahitian tree snail mitochondrial clades survived recent mass extirpation. Current Biology 17(13). (with Taehwan Lee and four other authors)
