= List of molluscs of Virginia =

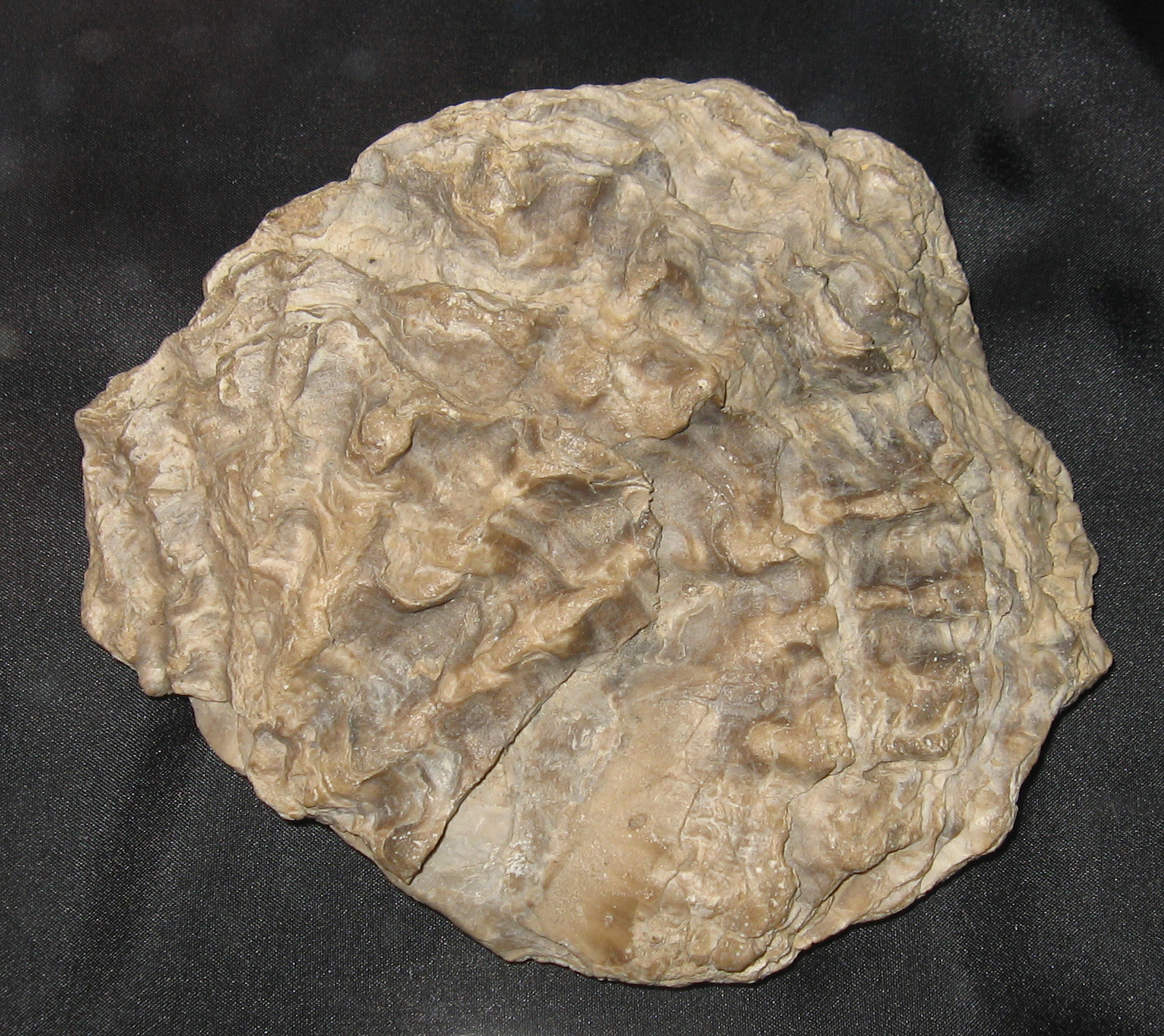
The shell of the Eastern oyster is the official state mollusc shell of Virginia

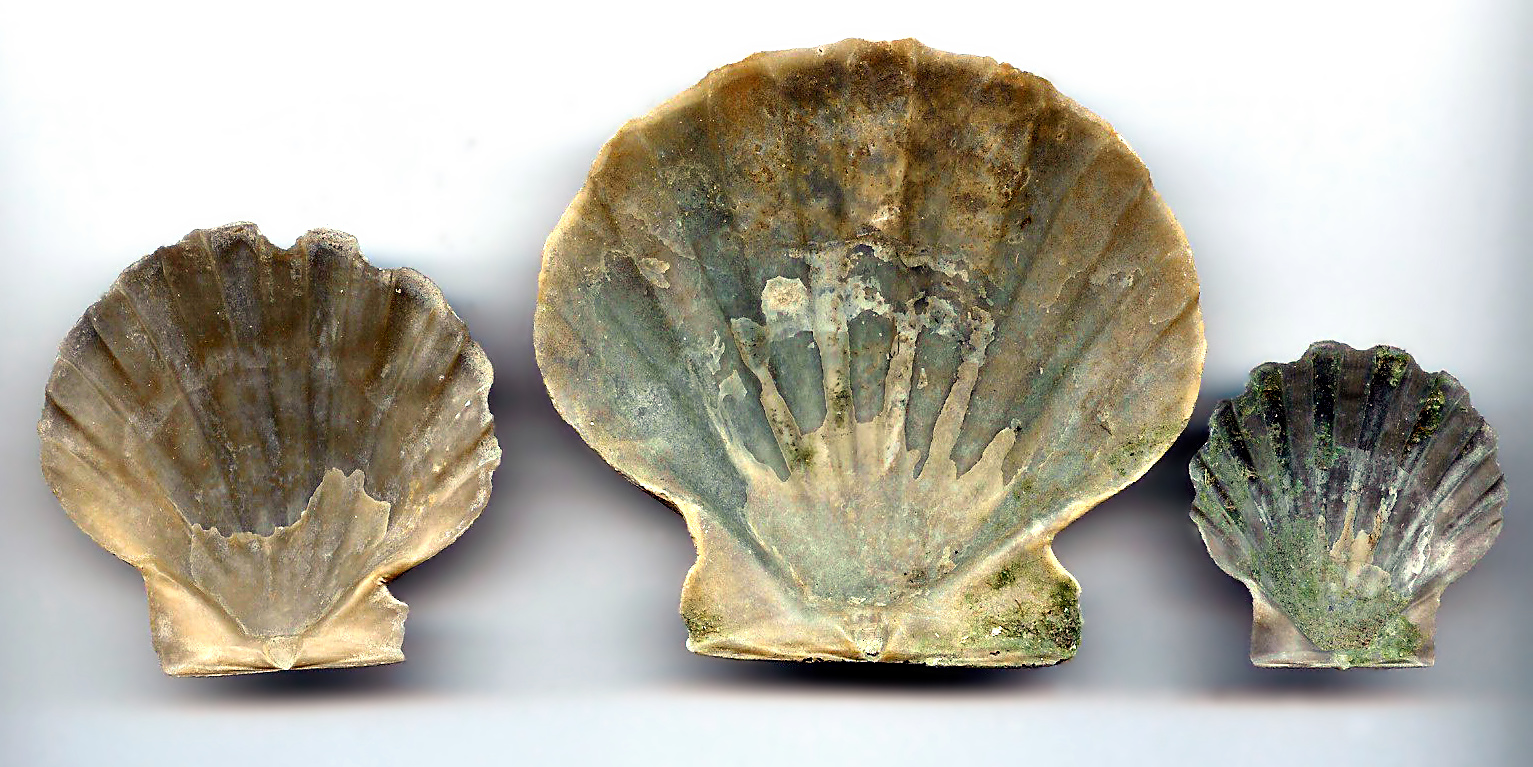
Fossils of the scallop species Chesapecten jeffersonius are the official state fossil of Virginia

This is a list of molluscs in Virginia, including both current and recently historical inhabitants. Species which are presumed extirpated are ~~crossed out~~.

== Land species ==
=== Land gastropods ===
==== Land snails ====
Name	Species / subspecies	Family	Conservation status			
Name	Species / subspecies	Family	IUCN Red List	Federal (ESA)	State (Virginia DWR)	State (NatureServe)
Alabama threetooth snail	Triodopsis alabamensis	Polygyridae				No Status Rank
Amber glass snail	Perpolita electrina	Gastrodontidae				Vulnerable (S3S4)
Angular disc snail	Discus catskillensis	Discidae				Vulnerable (S3S4)
Appalachian pillar snail	Cochlicopa morseana	Cionellidae				Apparently Secure (S4)
Appalachian thorn snail	Carychium clappi	Ellobiidae				Apparently Secure (S4)
Appalachian tigersnail	Anguispira mordax	Discidae				Vulnerable (S3S4)
Armed snaggletooth snail	Gastrocopta armifera	Pupillidae				Apparently Secure (S4)
Atlantic threetooth snail	Triodopsis juxtidens	Polygyridae				Apparently Secure (S4)
Baffled threetooth snail	Triodopsis fraudulenta	Polygyridae			Moderate Conservation Need (Tier IV)	Vulnerable (S3)
Balsam globe snail	Mesodon andrewsae	Polygyridae			Critical Conservation Need (Tier 1)	Critically Imperiled (S1)
Bark snaggletooth snail	Gastrocopta corticaria	Pupillidae				Vulnerable (S3)
Barred supercoil snail	Paravitrea seradens	Zonitidae			Very High Conservation Need (Tier II)	Imperiled (S2)
Bidentate dome snail	Ventridens coelaxis	Zonitidae			Very High Conservation Need (Tier II)	Imperiled (S2)
Big-tooth Whitelip	Neohelix dentifera	Polygyridae	N/A	N/A	N/A	Vulnerable (S3)
Magnolia threetooth snail	Triodopsis hopetonensis	Polygyridae				Vulnerable (S3S4)
Virginia fringed mountain snail/Virginia coil snail	Polygyriscus virginianus	Helicodiscidae	Data Deficient	Endangered	Critical Conservation Need (Tier 1)	Critically Imperiled (S1)
White-lip Globe Snail	Mesodon thyroidus	Polygyridae	N/A	N/A	N/A	Secure (S5)
Rubble coil snail	Helicodiscus lirellus	Helicodiscidae	N/A	Endangered	N/A	Critically Imperiled (S1)

==== Land slugs ====
Name	Species / subspecies	Family	Conservation status			
Name	Species / subspecies	Family	IUCN Red List	Federal (ESA)	State (Virginia DWR)	State (NatureServe)
Black mantleslug	Pallifera hemphilli	Philomycidae			Very High Conservation Need (Tier II)	Critically Imperiled (S1)
Blotchy mantleslug	Megapallifera wetherbyi	Philomycidae			Very High Conservation Need (Tier II)	Imperiled (S2)
Brown-spotted mantleslug	Philomycus venustus	Philomycidae				Vulnerable (S3)
Carolina mantleslug	Philomycus carolinianus	Philomycidae				Apparently Secure (S4)
Changeable mantleslug	Megapallifera mutabilis	Philomycidae				Apparently Secure (S4)
Dusky mantleslug	Philomycus batchi	Philomycidae				No Status Rank
Foster mantleslug	Pallifera fosteri	Philomycidae				Apparently Secure (S4)
Grayfoot mantleslug	Philomycus bisdosus	Philomycidae				No Status Rank
Meadow slug	Deroceras laeve	Limacidae	Least Concern			Vulnerable (S3)
Pale mantleslug	Pallifera dorsalis	Philomycidae				Apparently Secure (S4)
Severed mantleslug	Pallifera secreta	Philomycidae				Apparently Secure (S4)
Variable mantleslug	Philomycus togatus	Philomycidae			High Conservation Need (Tier III)	Apparently Secure (S4)
Virginia mantleslug	Philomycus virginicus	Philomycidae			High Conservation Need (Tier III)	Vulnerable (S3)
Winding mantleslug	Philomycus flexuolaris	Philomycidae				Apparently Secure (S4)

== Aquatic Species ==
=== Aquatic Gastropods ===
==== Freshwater snails ====
Name	Species / subspecies	Family	Conservation status			
Name	Species / subspecies	Family	IUCN Red List	Federal (ESA)	State (Virginia DWR)	State (NatureServe)
Virginia river snail	Elimia virginica	Pleuroceridae				Apparently Secure (S4)
Unthanks cave snail	Holsingeria unthanksensis	Cochliopidae	N/A		Endangered	Imperiled (S2)
Spiny Riversnail	Io fluvialis	Pleuroceridae	Endangered		Endangered	Imperiled (S2)

=== Bivalves ===
==== Freshwater Mussels ====
Name	Species / subspecies	Family	Conservation status			
Name	Species / subspecies	Family	IUCN Red List	Federal (ESA)	State (Virginia DWR)	State (NatureServe)
Alewife floater	Utterbackiana implicata	Unionidae				Vulnerable (S3)
Appalachian rockshell	Theliderma sparsa	Unionidae	Critically Endangered	Endangered, Experimental Population, Non-Essential	Endangered, Critical Conservation Need (Tier 1)	Critically Imperiled (S1)
Spectacle case pearly mussel	Cumberlandia monodonta	Margaritiferidae	Endangered	Endangered	Endangered, Critical Conservation Need (Tier 1)	Critically Imperiled (S1)
Dwarf wedgemussel	Alasmidonta heterodon	Unionidae	Vulnerable	Endangered	Endangered	Critically Imperiled (S1)

=== Cephalapods ===
Name	Species / subspecies	Family	Conservation status			
Name	Species / subspecies	Family	IUCN Red List	Federal (ESA)	State (Virginia DWR)	State (NatureServe)
Atlantic Brief Squid	Lolliguncula brevis	Loliginidae	Data Deficient	N/A	N/A	N/A

== See also ==
- List of arthropods in Virginia
