= Lucilla (disambiguation) =

Lucilla is a feminine Given name of Latin origin meaning "little light" or "bearer of light".

Lucilla may also refer to:

== People ==
- Lucilla (7 March 148 or 150 – 182) daughter of Roman emperor Marcus Aurelius
- Lucilla Agosti (born 1978), Italian radio and television presenter and actress
- Lucilla Andrews (1919-2006), British writer
- Lucilla Andreucci (born 1969), Italian long-distance runner
- Lucilla de Arcangelis, Italian statistical physicist
- Lucilla Boari (born 1997), Italian recurve archer
- Lucilla Bonaccorsi, Italian fashion designer
- Lucilla Green Cheney (1853-1878), American physician and missionary
- Lucilla Galeazzi (born 1950), Italian folk singer
- Lucilla Morlacchi (1936-2014), Italian film, television and stage actress
- Lucilla Perrotta (born 1975), Italian professional beach volleyball
- Lucilla Poston, British physiologist
- Lucilla Udovich (1930-1999), American soprano of Croatian ancestry
- Lucilla Wright (born 1979), former English field hockey international

== Fauna ==
- Daddala lucilla, species of moth in the family Erebidae
- Euchloe lucilla, small butterfly of the family Pieridae
- Lucilla (gastropod), a genus of very small air-breathing land snails
  - Lucilla scintilla, species of minute air-breathing land snail
  - Lucilla singleyana, species of minute air-breathing land snail

== Other uses ==
- Lucilla (album), an album by jazz musician Marco Di Meco
- Badia delle Sante Flora e Lucilla, Medieval abbey in Arezzo, Tuscany, Italy
