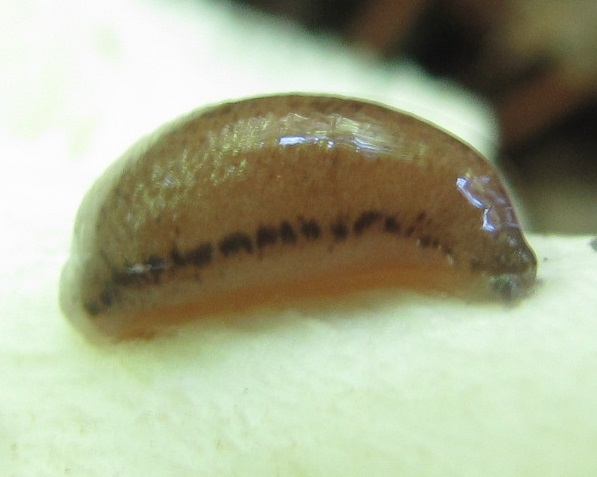
- Pallifera fosteri

Scientific classification
- Kingdom: Animalia
- Phylum: Mollusca
- Class: Gastropoda
- Order: Stylommatophora
- Family: Philomycidae
- Genus: Pallifera; E. S. Morse, 1864

Species
- See text

= Pallifera =

Genus of gastropods

Pallifera is a genus of air-breathing land slugs, terrestrial pulmonate gastropod mollusks in the family Philomycidae.

== Species ==
Species include:

- Pallifera costaricensis (Mörch, 1857)
- Pallifera dorsalis (Binney, 1842) – pale mantleslug
- Pallifera fosteri – Foster mantleslug
- Pallifera hemphilli – black mantleslug
- Pallifera marmorea – marbled mantleslug
- Pallifera megaphallica – woody mantleslug
- Pallifera ohioensis – redfoot mantleslug
- Pallifera pilsbryi – Arizona mantleslug
- Pallifera ragsdalei – whiteface mantleslug
- Pallifera secreta – severed mantleslug
- Pallifera tournescalis – Ouachita mantleslug
- Pallifera varia – variable mantleslug

== Cladogram ==
A cladogram based on sequences of cytochrome-c oxidase I (COI) genes showing phylogenic relations of genera in the family Philomycidae by Tsai & Wu (2008) (simplified):

- - - - Meghimatium
      - - - - - Philomycus
              - Pallifera
            - Megapallifera
          - Arion
    - Deroceras

Arion and Deroceras were used as outgroup.
