= De Arcangelis =

De Arcangelis is an Italian surname. Notable people with the surname include:

- Augusto De Arcangelis (born 1868), Italian painter
- Lucilla de Arcangelis, Italian physicist
- Riccardo De Arcangelis, Italian mathematician, winner of the Vinti Prize
