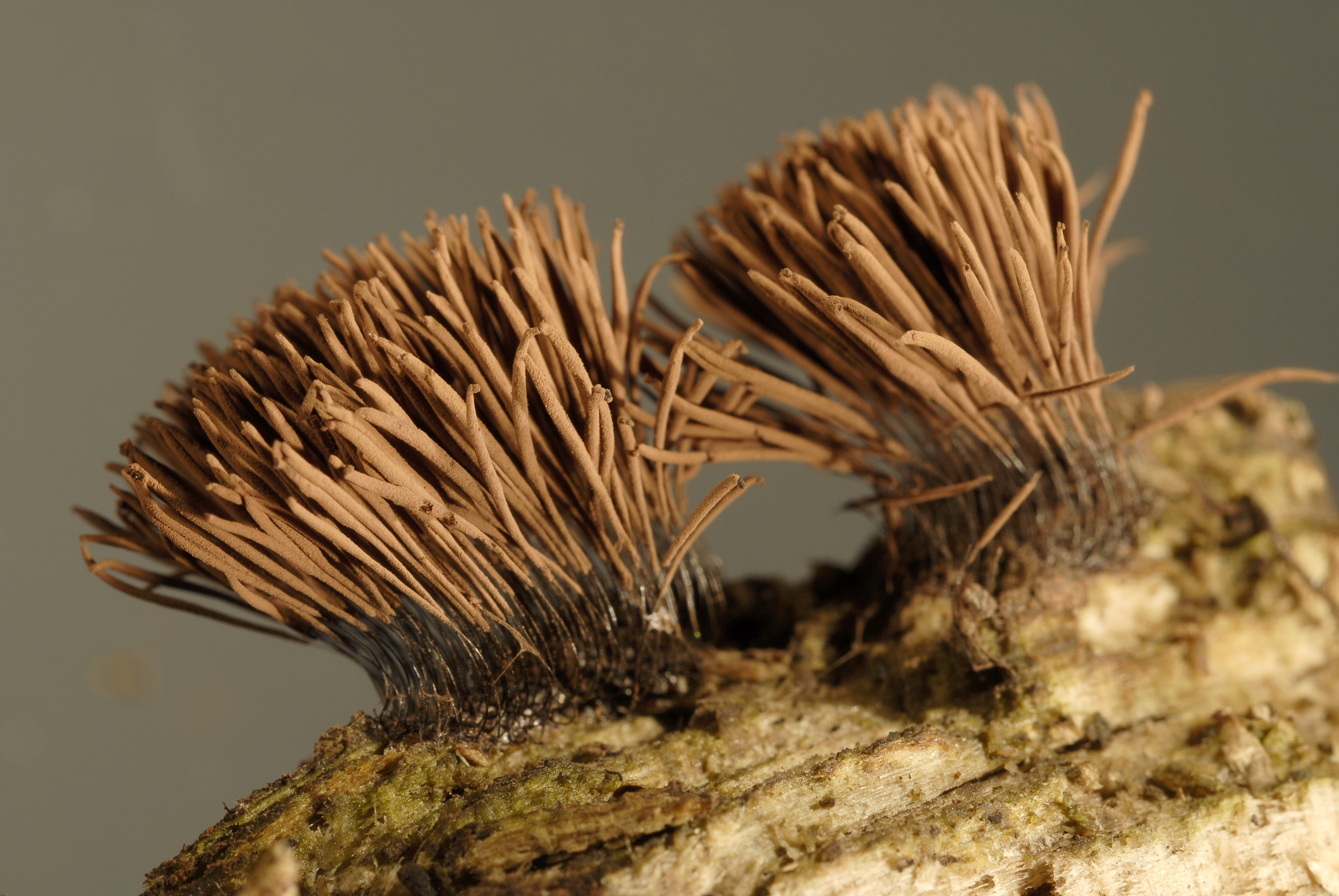

Scientific classification
- Domain: Eukaryota
- Phylum: Amoebozoa
- Class: Myxogastria
- Order: Stemonitidales
- Family: Stemonitidaceae
- Genus: Stemonitis
- Species: S. axifera

Binomial name
- Stemonitis axifera (Bull.) T.Macbr.

Synonyms
- Trichia axifera Bull. 1791; Stemonitis fasciculata Schumach. 1803; Stemonitis smithii T.Macbr. 1893

= Stemonitis axifera =

Species of slime mold

Stemonitis axifera is a species of slime mold. It fruits in clusters on dead wood, and has distinctive tall reddish-brown sporangia, supported on slender stalks.

== Taxonomy ==
The species was first described as Trichia axifera by Jean Baptiste François Pierre Bulliard in 1791. Thomas Huston MacBride transferred it to the genus Stemonitis in 1889. Stemonitis fasciculata and Stemonitis smithii are synonyms.

== Description ==
The erect, stalked cylindrical sporangia are arranged into bundles or clusters that are 7–15 mm (0.3–0.6 in) tall. Each sporangium is supported by a thin, shining, black stalk that is 3–7 mm (0.1–0.3 in) long. The bright rusty brown color of mature sporangia lightens to a pale brown after the spores have been dispersed. Spores measure 5 by 7 μm and have a smooth to minutely punctate surface texture.

== Development ==
Stemonitis axifera requires about 20 hours to finish making its fruit bodies. Of this, eight hours are needed for induction of the sporangia and the development of the stalk and the columella, six hours more for the sporocarps to produce pigment and mature, and an additional six until the spores are discharged.

== Ecology ==
The slime mold grows on decaying wood.

When the fruit bodies consist of milky white sporangia, they are a favoured food source for Philomycus slugs (mantleslugs), such as P. carolinianus and P. flexuolaris. The slugs emerge at night from under flaps of bark and migrate to more exposed areas at the top of wet logs, bypassing more mature, pigmented fruit bodies for the younger white ones. The slugs eat the sporangia stalks from the top down. The feeding preference of Philomycus slugs for immature white sporangia is not seen in other slug species.

One adult of the pleasing fungus beetle Aporotritoma pulchra was recorded to be associated with this slime mold, which would be a rather unusual food for these beetles; however, the single record does not imply that the beetle actually feeds regularly on slime molds.
