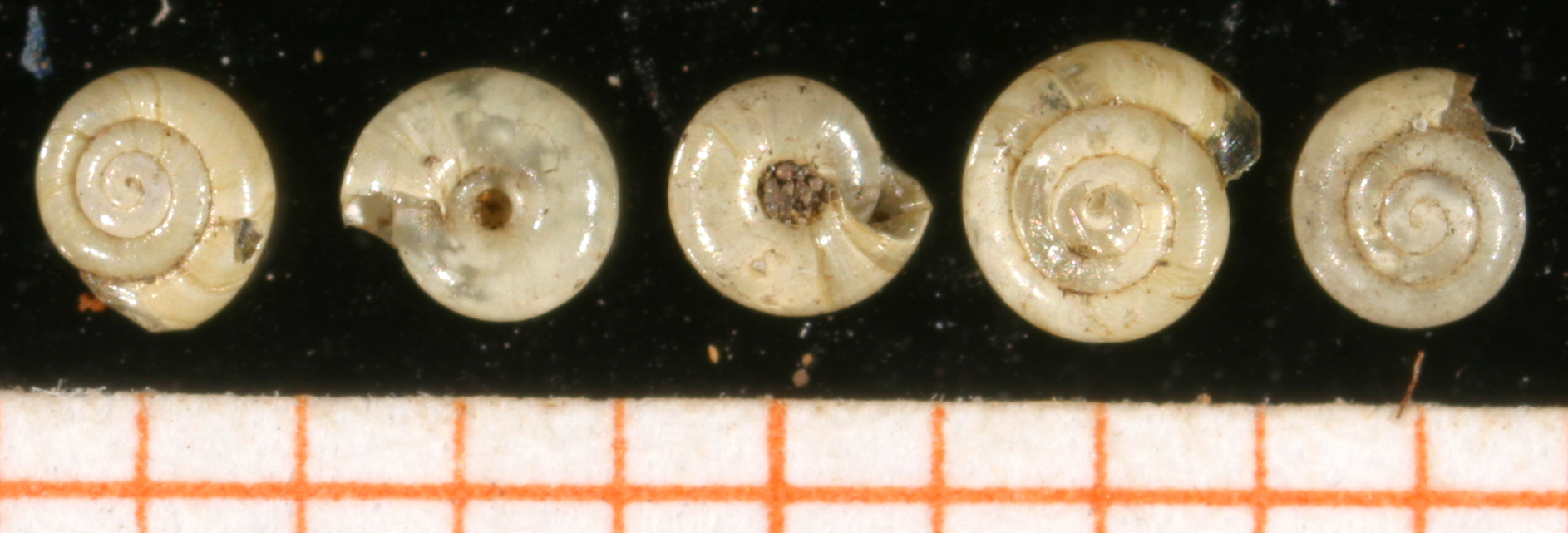
- Five shells of Lucilla singleyana, scale bar is in mm

Conservation status
- Secure (NatureServe)

Scientific classification
- Kingdom: Animalia
- Phylum: Mollusca
- Class: Gastropoda
- Order: Stylommatophora
- Family: Helicodiscidae
- Genus: Lucilla
- Species: L. singleyana

Binomial name
- Lucilla singleyana (Pilsbry, 1889)

Synonyms
- Helicodiscus (Hebetodiscus) singleyanus inermis H. B. Baker, 1929; Helicodiscus singleyanus (Pilsbry, 1890); Hyalinia laeviuscula Sterki, 1892; Hyalinia texana Sterki, 1892 (nomen nudum); Laoma (Phrixgnathus) academia Climo, 1970; Zonites singleyanus Pilsbry, 1889

= Lucilla singleyana =

Species of gastropod

Lucilla singleyana is a species of small air-breathing land snail, a terrestrial pulmonate gastropod mollusc or micromollusk in the family Helicodiscidae.

The shell of this species is about 2 mm (0.079 in) in width.

== Original description ==
Lucilla singleyana was originally discovered and described (under the name Zonites singleyanus) by Henry Augustus Pilsbry in 1889.

Pilsbry's original text (the type description) reads as follows:

Zonites singleyanus Pilsbry. Proc. A. N. S. Philada., 1888, PI. xvii, figs. m,m,m.

Shell minute, broadly umbilicate, planorboid, the spire scarcely perceptibly exserted; subtranslucent, waxen white, shining, smooth, under a strong lens seen to be slightly wrinkled by growth-lines; whorls three, rather rapidly increasing, separated by well-impressed sutures, convex, the apex rather large; body-whorl depressed, slightly descending, indented below around the umbilicus; aperture small, semilunar, oblique; peristome simple, acute. Umbilicus nearly one-third the diameter of the shell, wide, showing all the whorls.

Alt. 1, diam. 2 mill.

New Braunfels, Comal Co., Texas.

Allied to Z. minusculus, but much more depressed, more shining, smoother, smaller, with broader umbilicus and a complete whorl less than minusculus.

This species, one of the most 'distinct of the smaller forms of Hyalina, was communicated to me by Mr. J. A. Singley, in whose honor it is named. I have also found a few specimens among the shells collected by myself in central Texas, during the winter of 1885-'86. With Z. singleyanus at New Braunfels are found quantities of Z. minusculus. The latter species exhibits some variation, being often more depressed than most northern specimen. This depressed form has been noticed in Mexico by Strebel,* who proposes for Z. minusculus the new generic title of Chanomphalus, which of course is completely synonymous with Pseudohyalina Morse, 1864, and this again is not different enough from Hyalina to warrant the erection of a new genus or sub-genus. There is some variation in the width of the umbilicus in Texan specimens of Z. minusculus, but I have not seen specimens with it so wide as Dr. Dall indicates for his var. alachuana, from Florida. H elegantulus Pfr. is about the size and form of my Zonites singleyanus, but it is a strongly sculptured species.

* Vide Beitrag zur Kenntniss der Fauna mexikanischer Land und Süsswasser

Conchylien, Theil iv, p. 19, pi. iv, fig. 10. (1880.)

== Distribution ==
This species is Holarctic in distribution.

The indigenous distribution for this species includes North America.

Then non-indigenous distribution areas include:

- France
- Great Britain
- Poland
- Slovakia
- Ukraine

This species was previously announced from the Czech Republic since 1988, but later in 2009 was all findings recognized as Lucilla scintilla.

This species has been introduced to New Zealand.

== Ecology ==
This species lives in soil, see soil-inhabitant. Technically this is known as being a terricol species.
