= Megapallifera wetherbyi =

Conservation status
- Imperiled (NatureServe)

Scientific classification
- Kingdom: Animalia
- Phylum: Mollusca
- Class: Gastropoda
- Order: Stylommatophora
- Family: Philomycidae
- Genus: Megapallifera
- Species: M. wetherbyi

Binomial name
- Megapallifera wetherbyi (Binney, 1874)

Species of gastropod

Megapallifera wetherbyi, commonly known as the blotchy mantleslug, is a species of air-breathing land slug, a terrestrial gastropod mollusk in the family Philomycidae.

== Ecology ==
=== Morphology ===
Like the other slugs of its family Philomycidae, the mantle covers the entire top surface of the slug. The mantle is a very light gray with dark grey brown spots, and a band of brown that runs from the center down the length of the mantle. This slug species is 40-80 millimeters in length. Like the other slugs of its genus, they do not use love darts in reproduction.

=== Distribution and Habitat ===
This slug species is endemic to and restricted to the Cumberland Mountains and Cumberland Plateau. In Virginia this species is found only along the Kentucky border in the Southwest of the state. It is listed as critically endangered in the state of Kentucky, and endangered in Virginia and Tennessee.

=== Habitat ===
This slug is found in river bluffs and ravines, rocky forests, on rocky soils, on smooth bark trees and rocks. They have a preference for sandstone outcrops. They aestivate under loose bark, in tree holes and between rocks.
