= Helicodiscus diadema =

Conservation status
- Near Threatened (IUCN 2.3)

- Critically Imperiled (NatureServe)

Scientific classification
- Kingdom: Animalia
- Phylum: Mollusca
- Class: Gastropoda
- Order: Stylommatophora
- Family: Helicodiscidae
- Genus: Helicodiscus
- Species: H. diadema

Binomial name
- Helicodiscus diadema Grimm, 1967

Species of gastropod

Helicodiscus diadema, common name the shaggy coil, is a species of small air-breathing land snail, a terrestrial pulmonate gastropod mollusk in the family Helicodiscidae. This species is found only in Alleghany County in Virginia, United States.
