= Pallifera hemphilli =

Conservation status
- Apparently Secure (NatureServe)

Scientific classification
- Kingdom: Animalia
- Phylum: Mollusca
- Class: Gastropoda
- Order: Stylommatophora
- Family: Philomycidae
- Genus: Pallifera
- Species: P. hemphilli

Binomial name
- Pallifera hemphilli (Binney, 1885)

Species of gastropod

Pallifera hemphilli, the black mantleslug, is a species of air-breathing land slug, a terrestrial gastropod mollusk in the family Philomycidae.

== Description ==
This slug species is 25-30 millimeters in length. It has a uniform black coloration with no spots, and a dark gray foot. The mantle covers the entire upper side of the body. It does not use love darts

== Distribution ==
This slug species is endemic to and restricted to the Southern Appalachian Mountains. In Virginia, it is restricted to the Mount Rogers area.. It is critically endangered in the state of Virginia, and endangered in North Carolina and Tennessee.

=== Habitat ===
This slug is restricted to high elevation spruce-fir and conifer forests above 1500 meters. It can be found in rotting logs and on trees. Little is known about extant populations
