= Philomycus virginicus =

Conservation status
- Vulnerable (NatureServe)

Scientific classification
- Kingdom: Animalia
- Phylum: Mollusca
- Class: Gastropoda
- Order: Stylommatophora
- Family: Philomycidae
- Genus: Philomycus
- Species: P. virginicus

Binomial name
- Philomycus virginicus Hubricht, 1953

Species of gastropod

Philomycus virginicus, common name Virginia mantleslug, is a species of air-breathing land slug, a terrestrial pulmonate gastropod mollusc in the family Philomycidae.

== Description and anatomy ==
These slugs are large at 50-100mm long, and their mantle covers the entire upper side of their bodies. They create and use love darts as part of their mating behavior.

== Ecology ==
=== Range ===
These slugs are distributed from Virginia to Tennessee and west to Eastern Kentucky. In Virginia they are found from the Blue Ridge Mountains through the Ridge and Valley. This slug is rated vulnerable by NatureServe in Virginia, Imperiled in Tennessee and West Virginia, and Critically Imperiled in North Carolina
