= List of arthropods of Virginia =

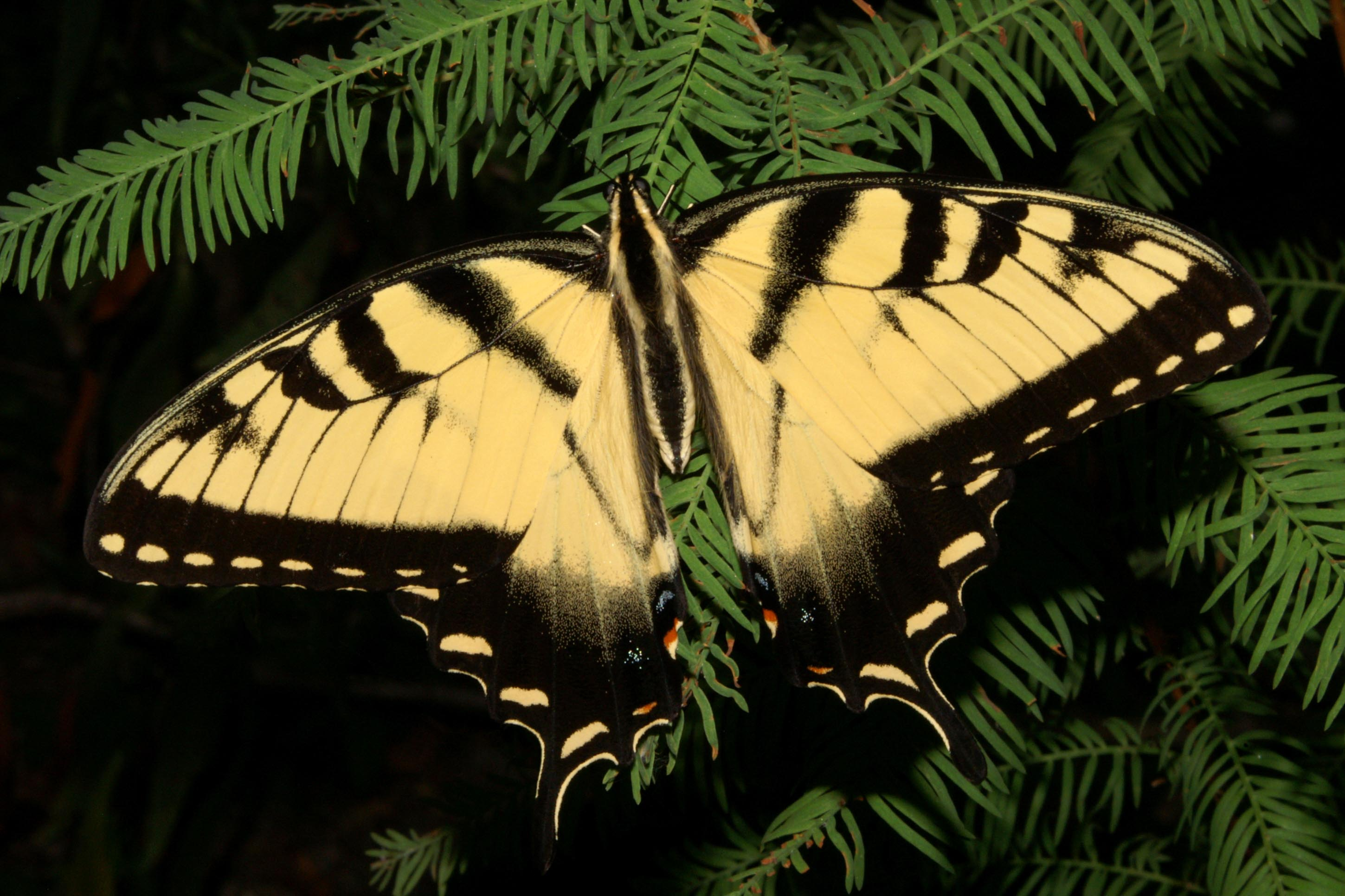
The Eastern Tiger Swallowtail (Papilio glaucus) is the state insect of Virginia

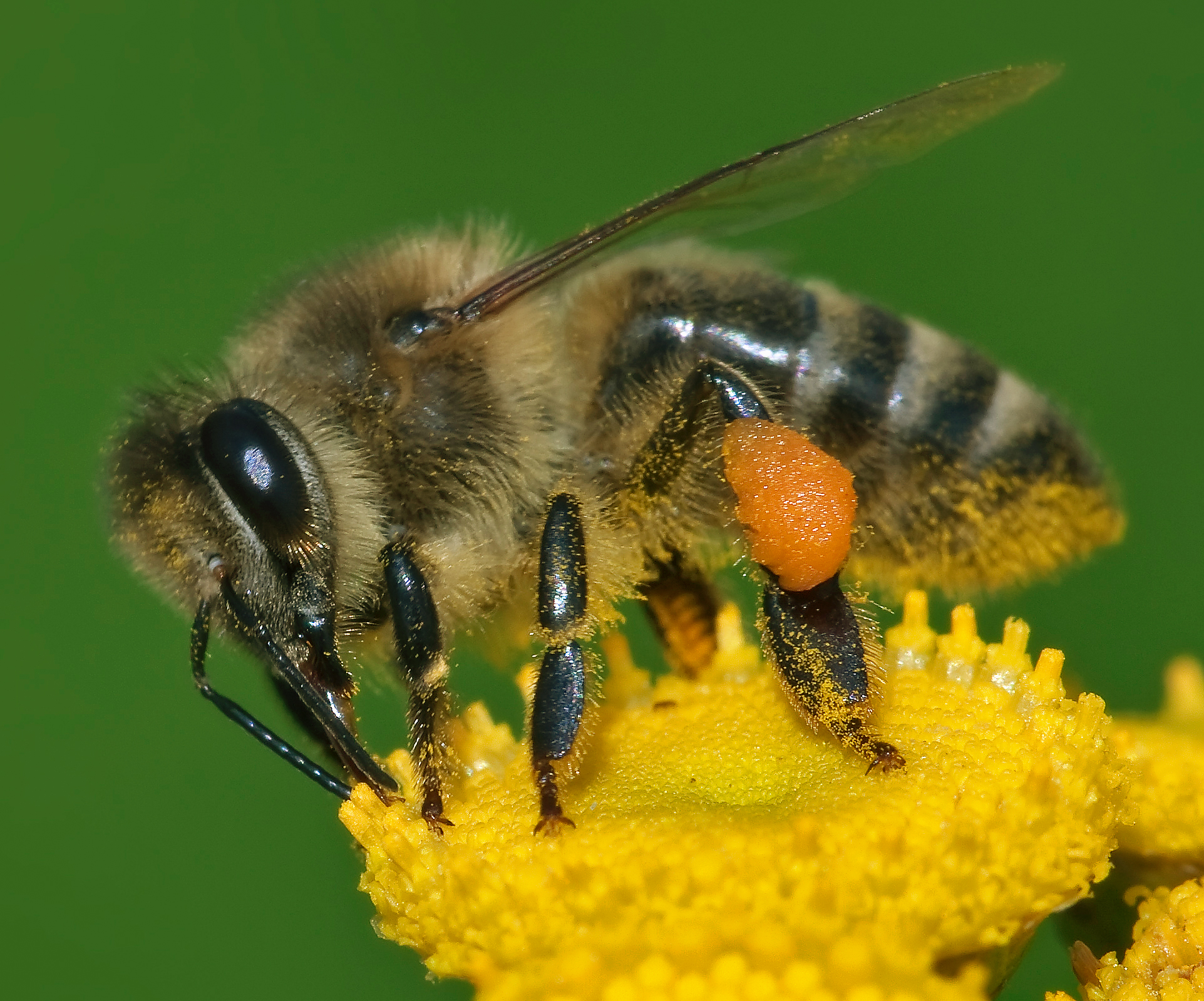
The European Honey Bee is the state Pollinator of Virginia

This is a list of arthropods in Virginia, including both current and recently historical inhabitants. Species which are presumed extirpated are ~~crossed out~~.

== Insecta (Insects) ==
=== Butterflies ===
Name	Species	Family	Conservation status			
Name	Species	Family	IUCN Red List	Federal (ESA)	State (Virginia DWR)	State (NatureServe)
Aaron's Skipper	Poanes aaroni	Hesperiidae				Vulnerable (S3)

=== Bees ===
Name	Species	Family	Conservation status			
Name	Species	Family	IUCN Red List	Federal (ESA)	State (Virginia DWR)	State (NatureServe)
Eastern Carpenter Bee	Xylocopa virginica	Apidae				No Status Rank
~~Variable Cuckoo Bumble Bee~~	~~Bombus variabilis~~	Apidae	Critically Endangered		Critical Conservation Need (Tier 1)	Presumed Extirpated (SX)
Yellow Bumble Bee	Bombus fervidus	Apidae	Vulnerable		Moderate Conservation Need (Tier IV)	Vulnerable (S3)
Yellow Banded Bumble Bee	Bombus terricola	Apidae	Vulnerable		High Conservation Need (Tier III)	Critically Imperiled (S1)
Angelic Sweat Bee	Agapostemon angelicus	Halictidae				Not Rated

=== Wasps ===
Name	Species	Family	Conservation status			
Name	Species	Family	IUCN Red List	Federal (ESA)	State (Virginia DWR)	State (NatureServe)
Bald-faced hornet	Dolichovespula maculata	Vespidae				

=== Cockroaches ===
Name	Species	Family	Conservation status			
Name	Species	Family	IUCN Red List	Federal (ESA)	State (Virginia DWR)	State (NatureServe)
Virginia Wood Cockroach	Parcoblatta virginica	Ectobiidae				
Pennsylvania Wood Cockroach	Parcoblatta pensylvanica	Ectobiidae				
Brown-hooded Cockroach	Cryptocercus punctulatus	Cryptocercidae				

== Arachnida (Arachnids) ==
=== Spiders ===
Name	Species	Family	Conservation status			
Name	Species	Family	IUCN Red List	Federal (ESA)	State (Virginia DWR)	State (NatureServe)
Spruce-fir Moss Spider	Microhexura montivaga	Dipluridae		Endangered	Endangered	Critically Imperiled (S1)
Atlantic Purse-web Spider	Sphodros atlanticus	Dipluridae	N/A	N/A	Endangered	Vulnerable (S3)

=== Scorpions ===
Name	Species	Family	Conservation status			
Name	Species	Family	IUCN Red List	Federal (ESA)	State (Virginia DWR)	State (NatureServe)
Southern Unstriped Scorpion	Vaejovis carolinianus	Vaejovidae			Moderate Conservation Need (Tier IV)	Critically Imperiled (S1)

== Myriapods (Millipedes and Centipedes) ==
=== Millipedes ===
Name	Species	Family	Conservation status			
Name	Species	Family	IUCN Red List	Federal (ESA)	State (Virginia DWR)	State (NatureServe)
Virginia cherry millipede	Apheloria virginiensis	Xystodesmidae			Moderate Conservation Need (Tier IV)	Secure (S5)
Traveling cherry millipede	Pleuroloma flavipes	Xystodesmidae				No Status Rank
Aeto Millipede	Conotyla aeto	Conotylidae			Very High Conservation Need (Tier II)	Critically Imperiled (S1)
Big Cedar Creek Millipede	Appalachioria falcifera (Note: Formerly known as Brachoria falcifera)	Xystodesmidae			Very High Conservation Need (Tier II)	Critically Imperiled (S1)
Blowing Rock Millipede	Cleidogona medialis	Cleidogonidae			Very High Conservation Need (Tier II)	Vulnerable (S3)
Ellett Valley Pseudotremia Millipede	Pseudotremia cavernarum	Cleidogonidae			Critical Conservation Need (Tier I)	Critically Imperiled (S1)
Laurel Creek xystodesmid Millipede	Sigmoria whiteheadi	Xystodesmidae			Critical Conservation Need (Tier I)	Critically Imperiled (S1)

=== Centipedes ===
Name	Species / subspecies	Family	Conservation status			
Name	Species / subspecies	Family	IUCN Red List	Federal (ESA)	State (Virginia DWR)	State (NatureServe)
Eastern Red Centipede	Scolopocryptops sexspinosus	Scolopocryptopidae				
Eastern Bark Centipede	Hemiscolopendra marginata	Scolopendridae				
Montane Centipede	Escaryus cryptorobius	Schendylidae				Imperiled (S2)

== Crustacea (Crustaceans) ==
=== Isopoda (Isopods) ===
==== Land Species ====
Name	Species	Family	Conservation status			
Name	Species	Family	IUCN Red List	Federal (ESA)	State (Virginia DWR)	State (NatureServe)
Lee County cave isopod	Lirceus usdagalun	Asellidae		Endangered		Critically Imperiled (S1)
Blue Ridge Rock Slater	Ligidium blueridgensis	Ligiidae				
Miktoniscus spinosus (Note: Does not have a common name)	Miktoniscus spinosus	Trichoniscidae				

==== Aquatic Species ====
Name	Species	Family	Conservation status			
Name	Species	Family	IUCN Red List	Federal (ESA)	State (Virginia DWR)	State (NatureServe)
Cumberland Gap Cave Isopod	Caecidotea cumberlandensis	Asellidae			Very High Conservation Need (Tier II)	Critically Imperiled (S1)

== See also ==
- List of molluscs in Virginia
