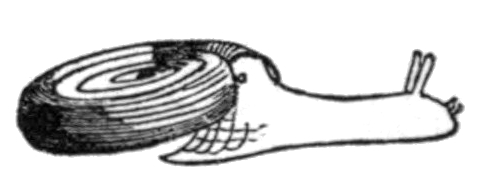
- A drawing of a live specimen of Helicodiscus parallelus

Conservation status
- Secure (NatureServe)

Scientific classification
- Kingdom: Animalia
- Phylum: Mollusca
- Class: Gastropoda
- Order: Stylommatophora
- Family: Helicodiscidae
- Genus: Helicodiscus
- Species: H. parallelus

Binomial name
- Helicodiscus parallelus (Say, 1821)

Synonyms
- Helicodiscus (Helicodiscus) parallelus (Say, 1821); Helicodiscus lineatus (Say, 1817); Helicodiscus theresa Thiele, 1927; Helix lineata Say, 1817; Planorbis paralellus Say, 1821

= Helicodiscus parallelus =

Species of gastropod

Helicodiscus parallelus, common name the compound coil, is a species of small air-breathing land snail, a terrestrial pulmonate gastropod mollusk in the family Helicodiscidae.

Helicodiscus parallelus is the type species of the genus Helicodiscus.

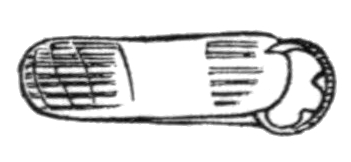
A drawing of an apertural view of the shell of Helicodiscus parallelus

== Distribution ==
This species occurs in the following countries and islands:

- Northern Mexico.
- Great Lakes region.
- Great Britain as a "hot-house alien"
- Brazil as an exotic species
