= Helicodiscus lirellus =

Conservation status
- Critically Imperiled (NatureServe)

Scientific classification
- Kingdom: Animalia
- Phylum: Mollusca
- Class: Gastropoda
- Order: Stylommatophora
- Family: Helicodiscidae
- Genus: Helicodiscus
- Species: H. lirellus

Binomial name
- Helicodiscus lirellus Hubricht, 1975

Species of gastropod

Helicodiscus lirellus, the rubble coil snail, is a species of air-breathing land snail, a terrestrial gastropod mollusk in the family Helicodiscidae.

== Distribution and habitat ==
This snail is endemic to the state of Virginia, so far only found in Rockbridge County, Virginia, around Maury River. It is found in leaf litter, limestone rich scree, steep forested slopes, and shale rubble
