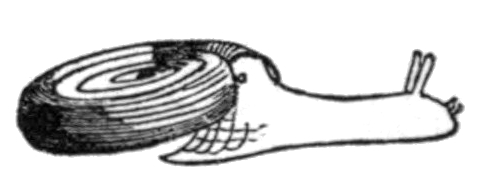
- Drawing of a live individual of Helicodiscus parallelus

Scientific classification
- Kingdom: Animalia
- Phylum: Mollusca
- Class: Gastropoda
- Order: Stylommatophora
- Family: Helicodiscidae
- Subfamily: Helicodiscinae
- Genus: Helicodiscus; E. S. Morse, 1864

= Helicodiscus =

Genus of gastropods

Helicodiscus is a genus of air-breathing land snails, terrestrial pulmonate gastropod mollusks in the family Helicodiscidae.

== Species ==
Species within the genus Helicodiscus include:

- Helicodiscus diadema
- Helicodiscus eigenmanni (Chamberlin and Berry, 1929) - Mexican coil
- Helicodiscus hexodon
- Helicodiscus parallelus - the type species
- Helicodiscus lirellus
