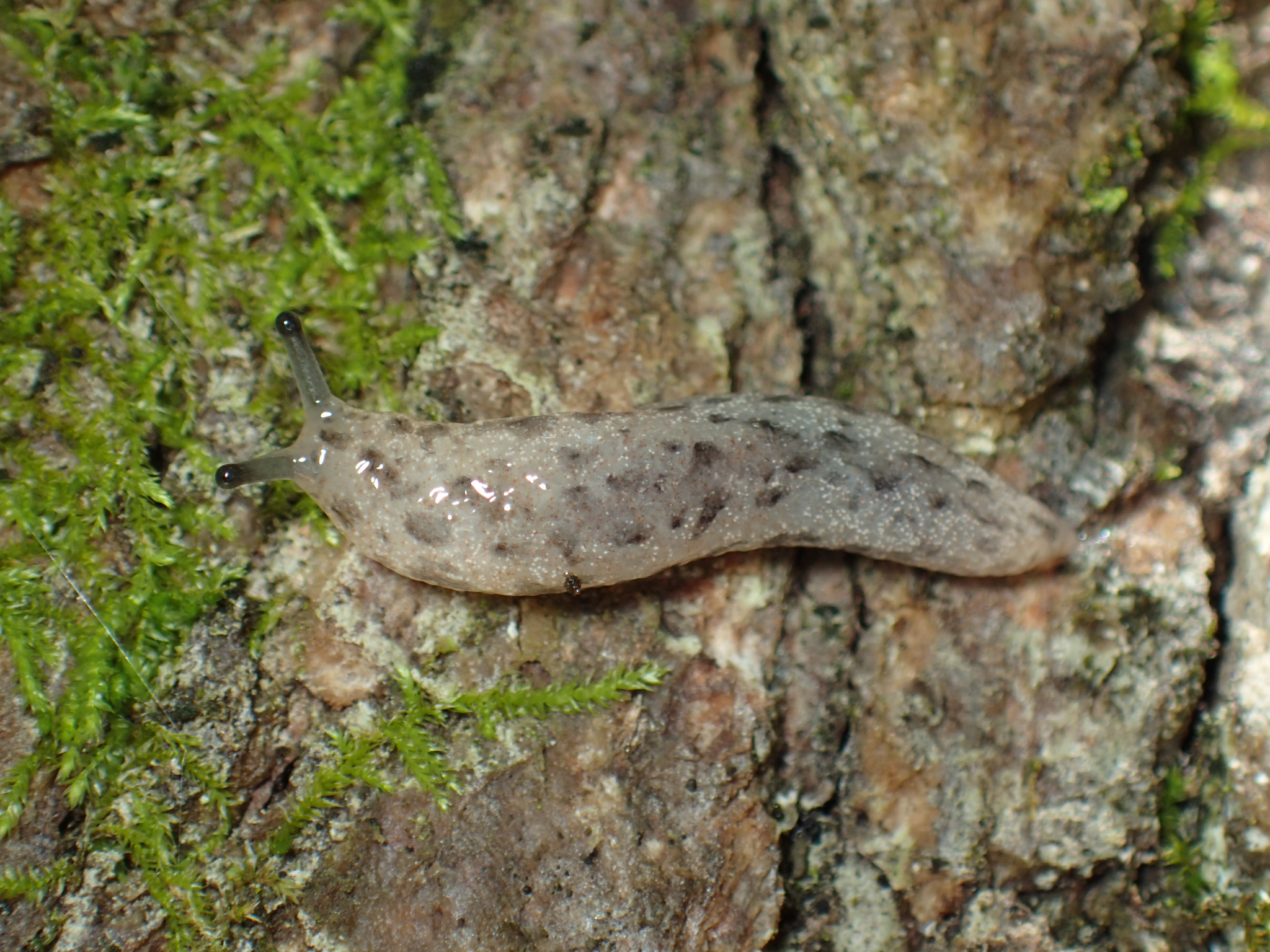

Conservation status
- Secure (NatureServe)

Scientific classification
- Kingdom: Animalia
- Phylum: Mollusca
- Class: Gastropoda
- Order: Stylommatophora
- Family: Philomycidae
- Genus: Philomycus
- Species: P. togatus

Binomial name
- Philomycus togatus (A. Gould, 1841)

Synonyms
- Limax togata A. Gould, 1841; Philomycus carolinianus collinus Hubricht, 1951

= Philomycus togatus =

Species of gastropod

Philomycus togatus, also known as the toga mantleslug, is a species of land slug, a terrestrial pulmonate gastropod mollusk in the family Philomycidae.

== Anatomy ==
These slugs create and use love darts as part of their mating behavior.
