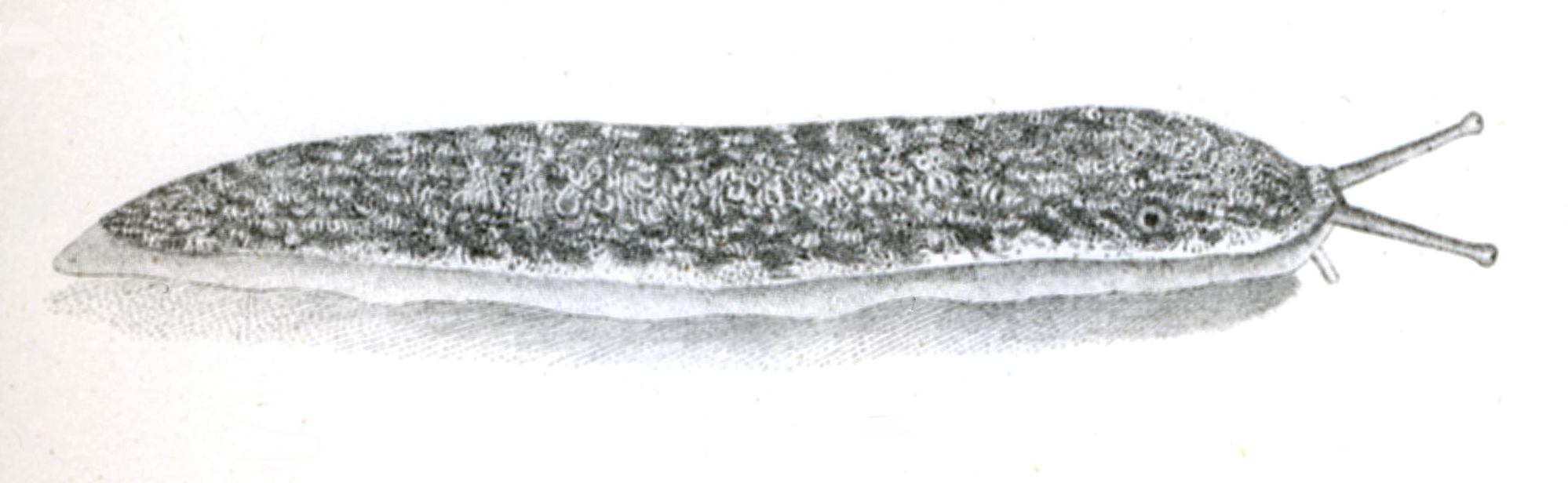
- Drawing of Philomycus carolinianus from W. G. Binney, 1878

Conservation status
- Secure (NatureServe)

Scientific classification
- Kingdom: Animalia
- Phylum: Mollusca
- Class: Gastropoda
- Order: Stylommatophora
- Family: Philomycidae
- Genus: Philomycus
- Species: P. carolinianus

Binomial name
- Philomycus carolinianus (Bosc, 1802)

= Philomycus carolinianus =

Species of gastropod

Philomycus carolinianus, also known as the Carolina mantleslug, is a species of land slug. It is a terrestrial gastropod mollusk in the family of Philomycidae. This species is a part of the fauna of the Carolinian Forest in Canada. This species is also a plays a vital role in the ecosystem through nutrient cycling.

== Anatomy ==
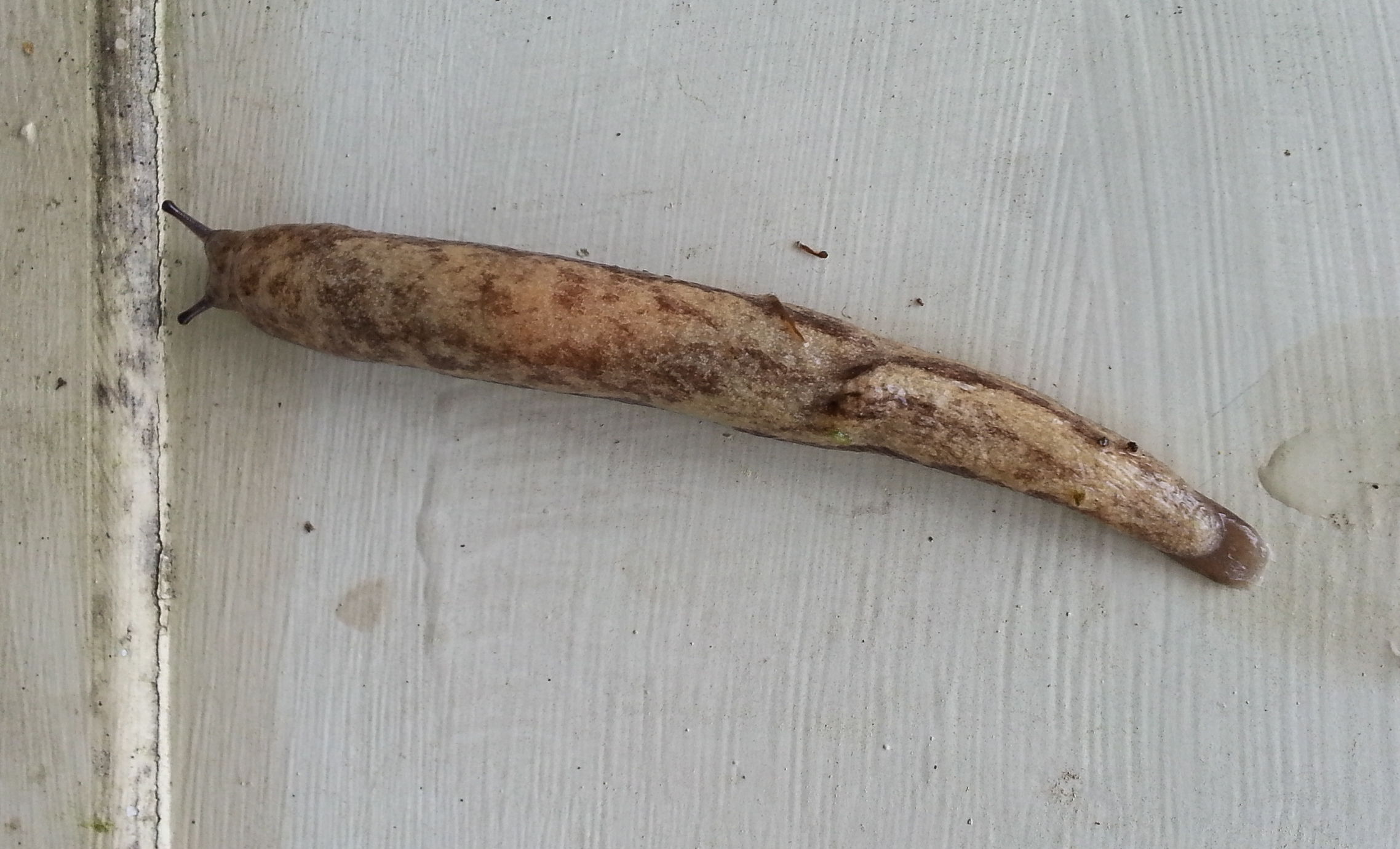

The Carolina mantleslug is approximately two inches long in body length. The Carolina mantleslug has a radula in their mouth. A radula is a flexible, ribbonlike structure that is lined with many rows of teeth. These teeth are exceptional at scraping food from plants. The Carolina mantleslug also has tentacles at the top of their head. These tentacles have an eye at the very tip. They are usually tan or brown in color and they are covered in spots. Their mantle also covers the entire doral surface. Slugs that are within the Philomycidae family possess a large shell sac which is usually empty. These slugs create and use love darts as part of their mating behavior. The dart of Philomycus carolinianus is thick and curved.

== Diet ==
The Carolina mantleslug prefers a moist environment that is full of trees. Unlike most slugs, they do not invade gardens. The Carolina mantleslug is often observed eating fungi as well as lichen during night. They are nocturnal, so they mostly are active during night and eat during the night as well. The Carolina mantleslug are important in the decomposition of organic materials. They feed on a lot of decaying and decomposing organic materials. They also consume mushrooms, lichen, lettuce, algae and other organic matter.

== Ecology ==
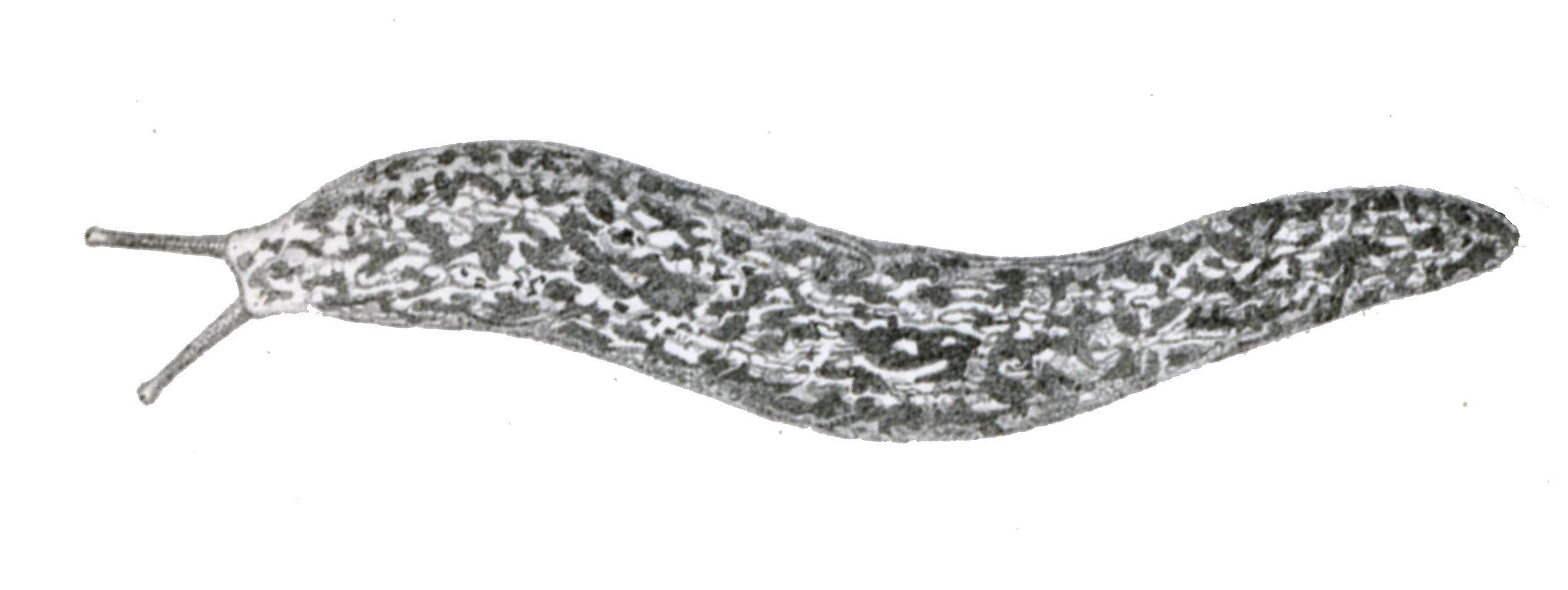

The Carolina mantleslug is very common in swamps that are located along the Gulf and Atlantic coasts as well as in floodplain woods on the piedmont and interior of the continent. They prefer moist and deciduous woodland habitats. Unlike most slugs, they do not invade gardens. They are mostly found in low lit areas, as they prefer wetter environments. They are normally found in heavily wooded areas, and on occasion will forage out in the open. They can also be active during cloudy conditions. The Carolina mantleslug is found in the following states: Alabama, Arkansas, Florida, Georgia, Illinois, Indiana, Maryland, Michigan, Mississippi, Missouri, New Jersey, New York, North Carolina, Ohio, Oklahoma, Pennsylvania, South Carolina, Tennessee, Texas, Virginia, West Virginia, and Wisconsin. They are also native to Canada specifically in the Ontario region.

== Behaviors ==
The Carolina mantleslug uses love darts as a part of their mating behavior. A love dart (also known as gypsobelum) is a calcareous/chitinous dart that is hard, long, and sharp. Love darts are also found in sexually mature animals only, and are used as a part of the sequence of events during mating. They are used before the actual mating takes place. These darts are quite large in comparison to the animals. Prior to copulation, the slugs will attempt to shoot darts into the other slug. There is no actual organ that receives the dart, however, this action is more similar to a stabbing motion. The dart also does not fly into the air to reach its target. It is fired as a contact shot. Then, the exchange of sperm happens and both of the slugs will separate to complete the mating ritual. The love darts have a harpoon-like shape which enables them to pierce through the skin. The Carolina mantleslug is an egg-laying slug. They reproduce during the spring and late summer. They hibernate from early October until April in temperate regions. Sexual maturity is reached after one year and the species can live up to 4 years. The Carolina mantleslug lays 1-2 groups of about 70 eggs, depending on their diet. They have a hatching success of about 75% and this varies with the external temperature. Active dispersal in terms of colonization is extremely low due to the fact that the species stays confined to sheltered micro-habitats.
