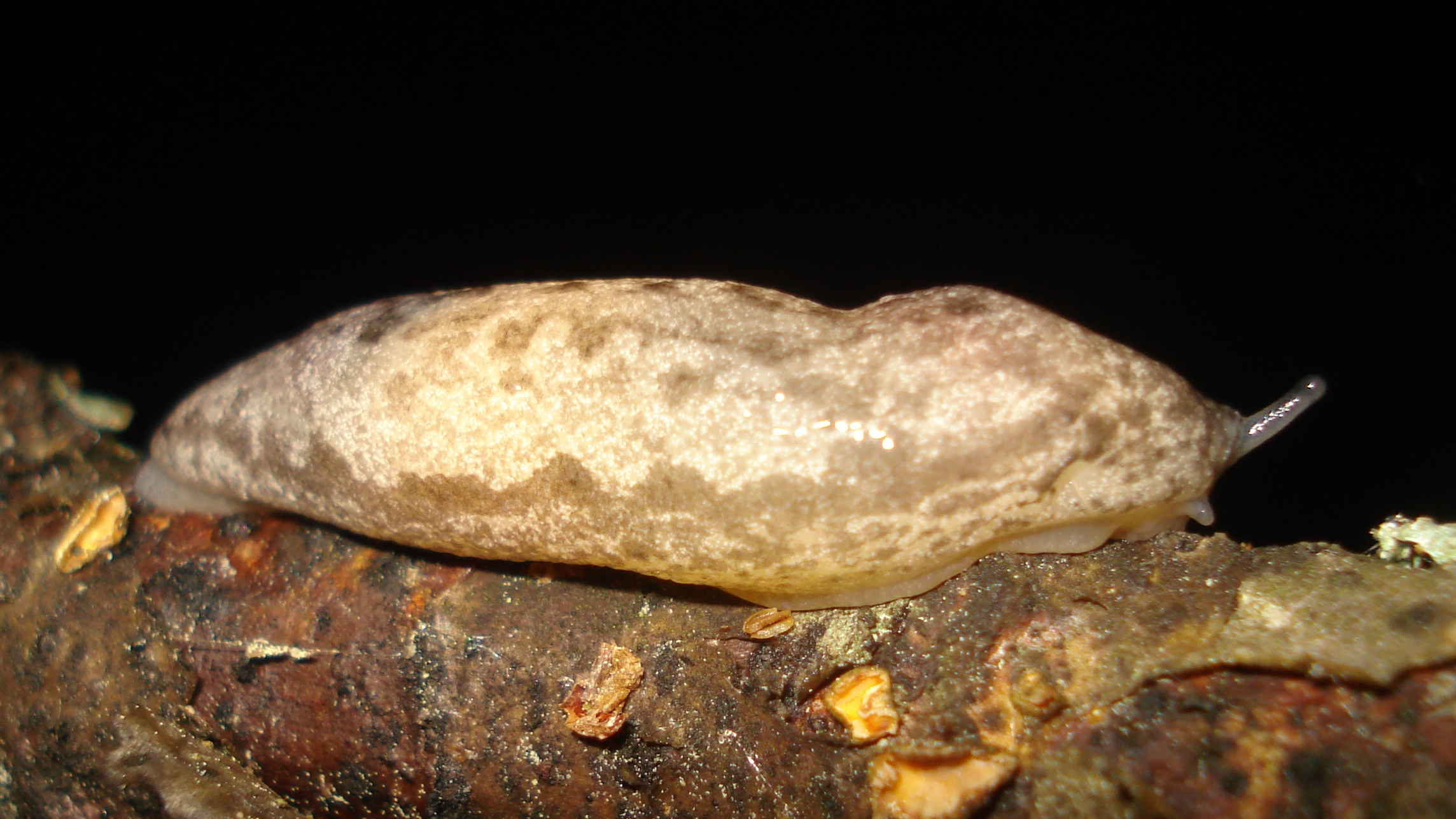

Conservation status
- Secure (NatureServe)

Scientific classification
- Kingdom: Animalia
- Phylum: Mollusca
- Class: Gastropoda
- Order: Stylommatophora
- Family: Philomycidae
- Genus: Megapallifera
- Species: M. mutabilis

Binomial name
- Megapallifera mutabilis (Hubricht, 1951)

Synonyms
- Pallifera mutabilis Hubricht, 1951

= Megapallifera mutabilis =

Species of gastropod

Megapallifera mutabilis, common name the changeable mantleslug, is a species of air-breathing land slug, a terrestrial pulmonate gastropod mollusk in the family Philomycidae.

== Description ==
This slug is called a Mantleslug because the mantle covers the entire body, like the other slugs of its family Philomycidae. Like other slugs in the genus Megapallifera, it is not one of the gastropod species which uses love darts.

== Distribution ==
Native to and found throughout eastern North America, from Ontario, Canada at the most north, down to the Gulf Coast of the United States east of Texas at the most southern The species is ranked by NatureServe as critically imperiled in Ontario, vulnerable in Pennsylvania and Kentucky, and apparently secure in Virginia, North Carolina and Tennessee. It is present in but has no ranking in the U.S. states of New York, West Virginia, South Carolina, Ohio, Indiana, Delaware, Maryland, Georgia, Alabama, Mississippi, Louisiana, Arkansas, Missouri, Illinois, Iowa and Texas.

== Ecology ==
This slug can be found in deciduous forest habitats, where they are often arboreal. It eats primarily algae, and lives in live trees such as American beech. The species has been observed to huddle with 2-5 other individuals in water filled tree holes, and to dip its tail into water to rehydrate after returning from foraging. As many as 12 individuals will reside in the same tree hole. This slug lives for about one year and multiple generations will use the same tree holes.
