= Augusto De Arcangelis =

Italian painter (1868–?)

Augusto De Arcangelis (born in Lanciano, Province of Chieti, June 22, 1868) was an Italian painter, active mainly in Naples, depicting genre subjects and landscapes.

== Biography ==
A local contest awarded him a stipend from the province of Chieti to study at Naples.

In 1887 he exhibited at the Promotrice Salvator Rosa, a study: Il mio sogno; in 1888, Innocenza. In 1888 at Aquila, a seascape and Ingenuità napoletana. In 1902 at Turin, Come le rose.

He was one of the painters represented in the exhibition of Il sentimento della Natura, held in 2012 at the Museo Vittoria Colonna of Pescara.
