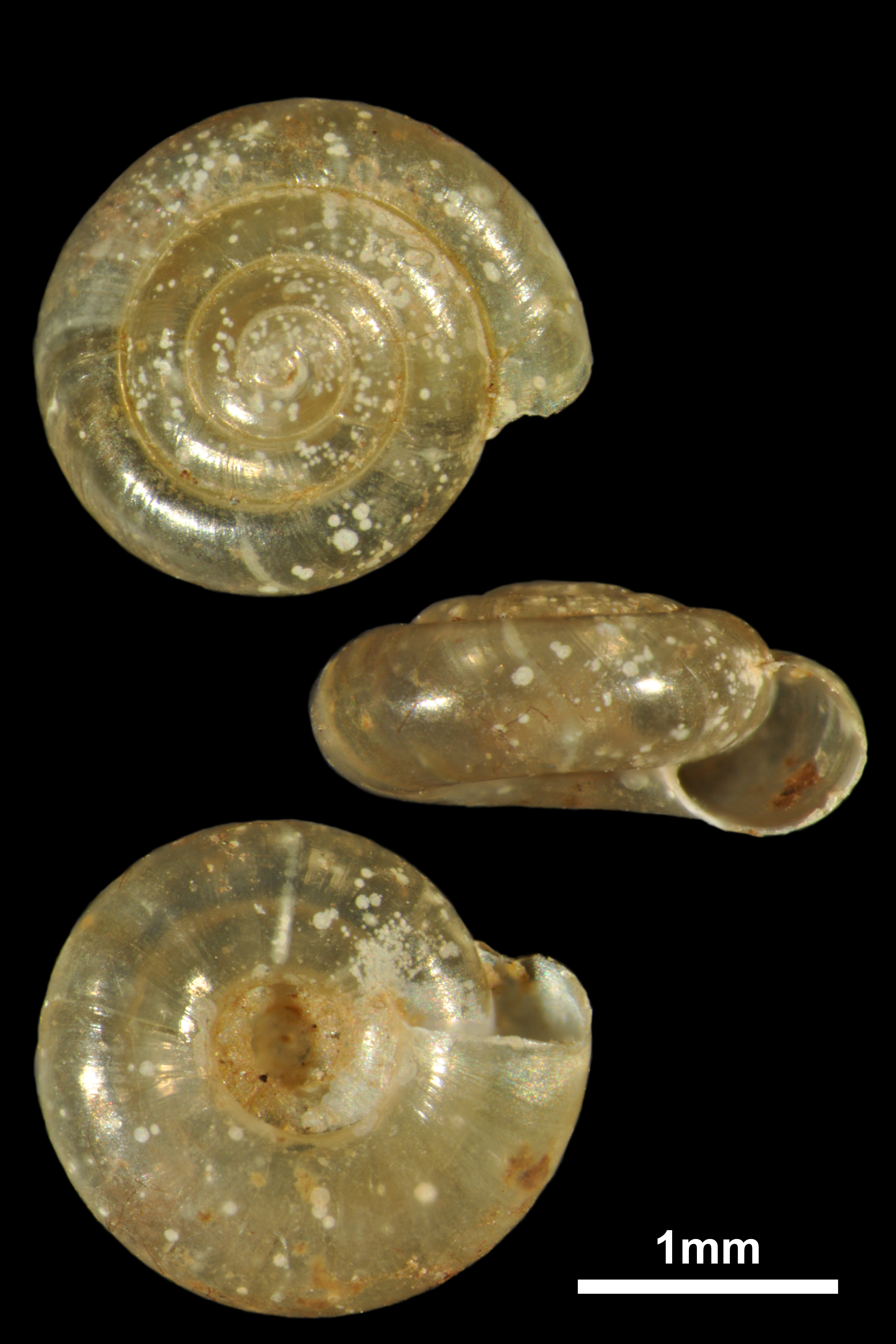
- shells of Lucilla scintilla

Conservation status
- Apparently Secure (NatureServe)

Scientific classification
- Kingdom: Animalia
- Phylum: Mollusca
- Class: Gastropoda
- Order: Stylommatophora
- Family: Helicodiscidae
- Genus: Lucilla
- Species: L. scintilla

Binomial name
- Lucilla scintilla Lowe, 1852

Synonyms
- Helix (Lucilla) scintilla Lowe, 1852

= Lucilla scintilla =

Species of gastropod

Lucilla scintilla is a species of small air-breathing land snail, a terrestrial pulmonate gastropod mollusk or micromollusk in the family Helicodiscidae.

Lucilla scintilla is the type species of the genus Lucilla.

== Distribution ==
The indigenous distribution for this species includes North America.

The non-indigenous distribution areas include:

- Czech Republic
- Slovakia
- France

== Ecology ==
This species lives in soil, see soil-inhabitant. Technically this is known as being a terricol species.
