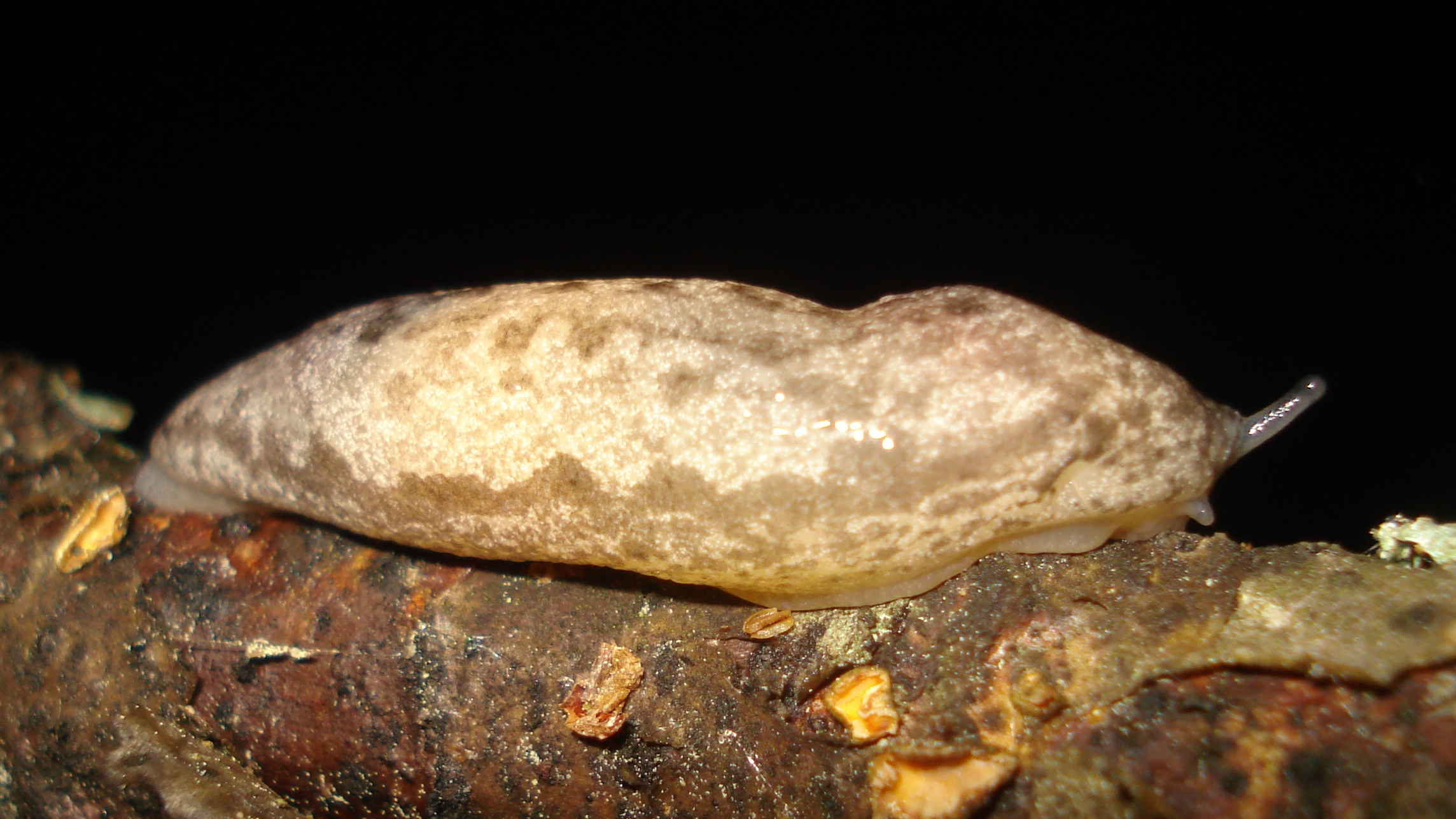
- A live individual of Megapallifera mutabilis

Scientific classification
- Kingdom: Animalia
- Phylum: Mollusca
- Class: Gastropoda
- Order: Stylommatophora
- Family: Philomycidae
- Genus: Megapallifera; Hubricht, 1956

Type species
- Pallifera mutabilis Hubricht, 1951

Species
- M. mutabilis (Hubricht, 1951); M. ragsdalei (Webb, 1950); M. wetherbyi (Binney, 1874)

Synonyms
- Pallifera (Megapallifera) Hubricht, 1956

= Megapallifera =

Genus of gastropods

Megapallifera is a genus of air-breathing land slugs, terrestrial pulmonate gastropod mollusks in the family Philomycidae.

== Species ==
Species in the genus Megapallifera include:

- Megapallifera mutabilis (Hubricht, 1951)
- Megapallifera ragsdalei (Webb, 1950)
- Megapallifera wetherbyi (Binney, 1874)
