= Chanomphalus =

Scientific classification
- Kingdom: Animalia
- Phylum: Mollusca
- Class: Gastropoda
- Order: Stylommatophora
- Family: Helicodiscidae
- Genus: Chanomphalus; Strebel & Pfeffer, 1879

Genus of land snails

Chanomphalus is a genus of gastropods belonging to the family Helicodiscidae.

The species of this genus are found in Central America.

Species:

- Chanomphalus angelae Dourson, Caldwell & Dourson, 2018
- Chanomphalus cidariscus (Martens, 1892)
- Chanomphalus pilsbryi (Baker, 1927)
- Chanomphalus tatei Pilsbry, 1903
