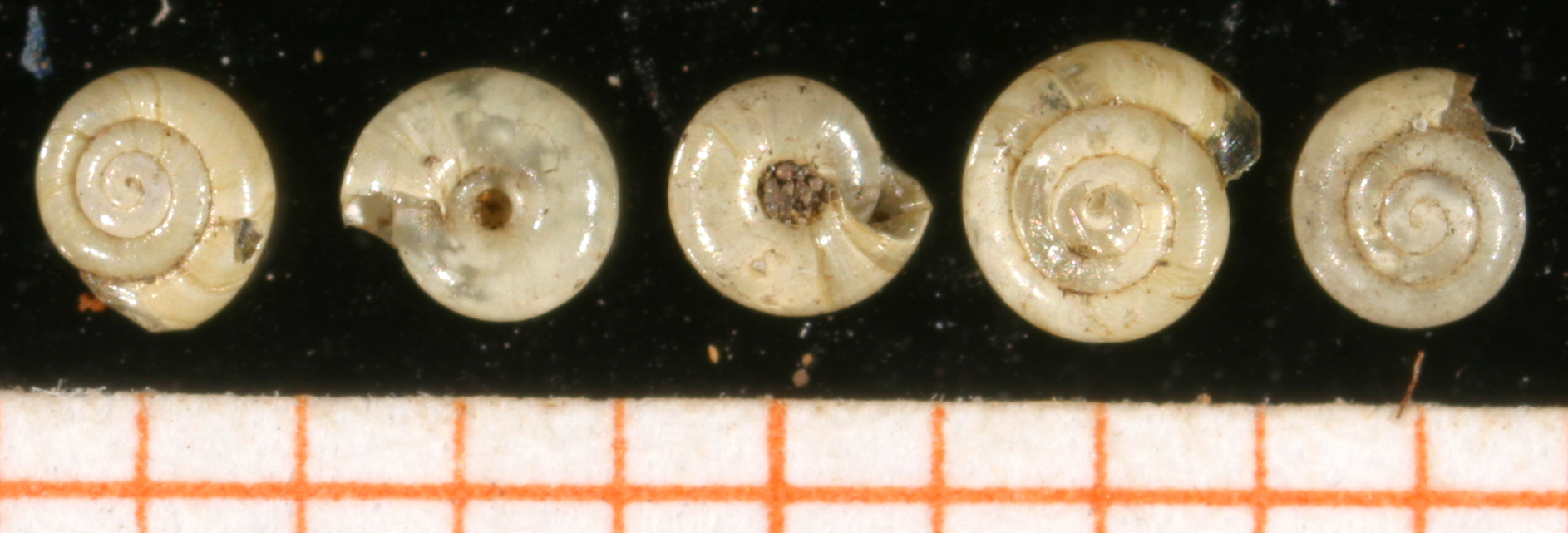
- Five shells of Lucilla singleyana, scale bar is in mm

Scientific classification
- Kingdom: Animalia
- Phylum: Mollusca
- Class: Gastropoda
- Order: Stylommatophora
- Family: Helicodiscidae
- Genus: Lucilla; Lowe, 1852

Type species
- Helix scintilla R. T. Lowe, 1852

Synonyms
- Hebetodiscus H. B. Baker, 1929; Hydrophrea Climo, 1974

= Lucilla (gastropod) =

Genus of gastropods

Lucilla is a genus of very small air-breathing land snails, terrestrial pulmonate gastropod mollusks or micromollusks in the family Helicodiscidae.

== Species ==
The genus Lucilla includes the following species:

- Lucilla inermis (H. B. Baker, 1929)
- † Lucilla miocaenica Harzhauser, Neubauer & Esu in Harzhauser et al., 2015
- Lucilla nummus (Vanatta, 1900)
- Lucilla scintilla (Lowe, 1852)
- Lucilla singleyana (Pilsbry, 1889)
- † Lucilla subteres (Clessin, 1877)
- † Lucilla victoris (Michaud, 1862)
