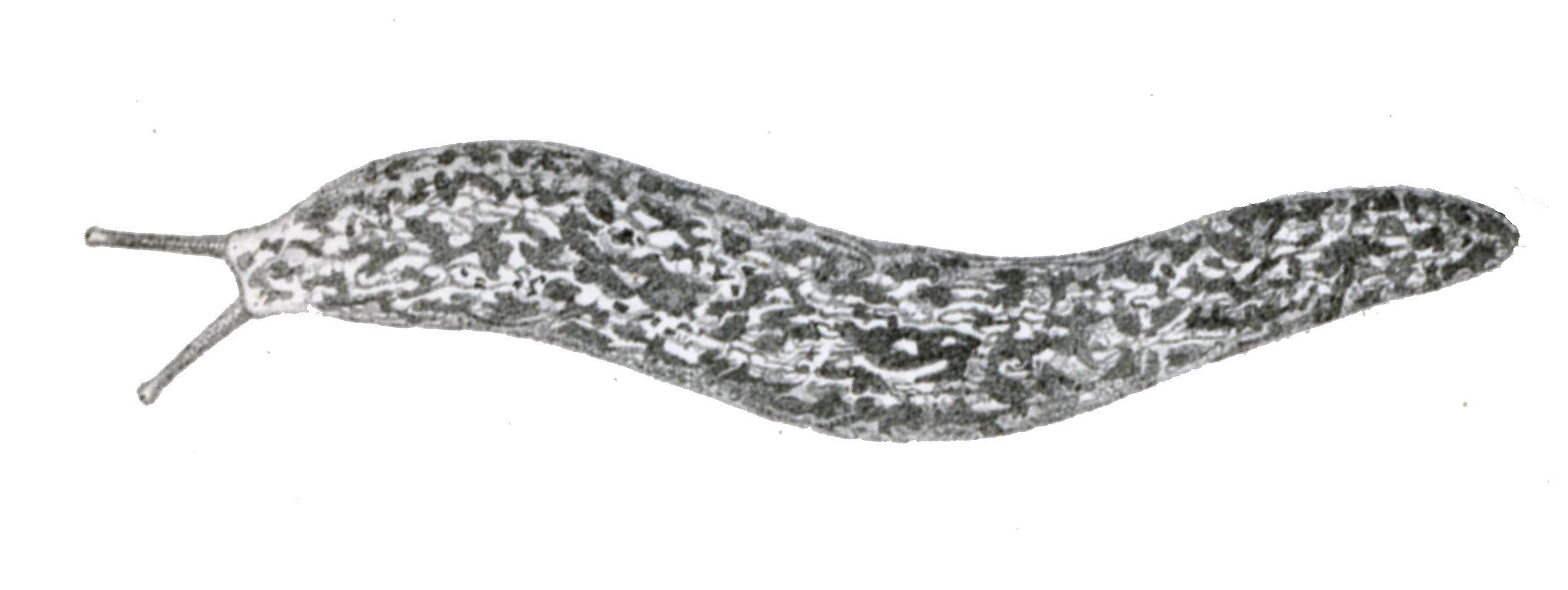
- Philomycus carolinianus

Scientific classification
- Domain: Eukaryota
- Kingdom: Animalia
- Phylum: Mollusca
- Class: Gastropoda
- Order: Stylommatophora
- Family: Philomycidae
- Genus: Philomycus; Rafinesque, 1820

= Philomycus =

Genus of gastropods

Philomycus is a genus of air-breathing land slugs in the family Philomycidae, the mantleslugs.

== Biology ==
These slugs create and use love darts as part of their mating behavior.

== Species ==
Species within the genus Philomycus include:

- Philomycus batchi - dusky mantleslug
- Philomycus bilineatus
- Philomycus bisdosus - grayfoot mantleslug
- Philomycus cardmensis
- Philomycus carolinianus - Carolina mantleslug
- Philomycus dorsalis
- Philomycus flexuolaris - winding mantleslug
- Philomycus pennsylvanicus
- Philomycus sellatus - Alabama mantleslug
- Philomycus togatus - toga mantleslug
- Philomycus venustus - brown-spotted mantleslug
- Philomycus virginicus - Virginia mantleslug
