= Mantle (mollusc) =

Part of the anatomy of molluscs

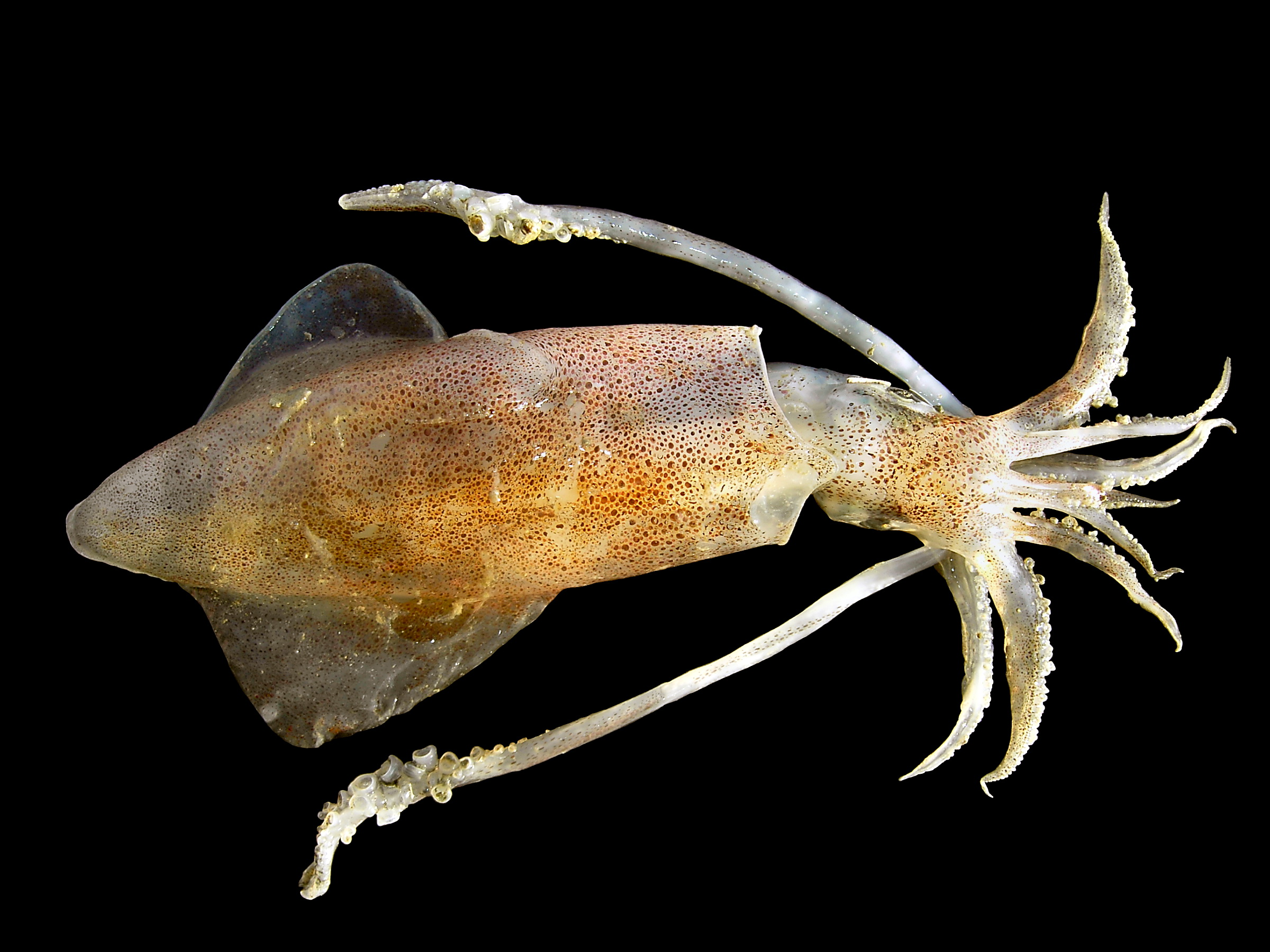
European squid (Loligo vulgaris). The mantle is all that is visible behind the head: the outer body wall and the fins are all part of the mantle.

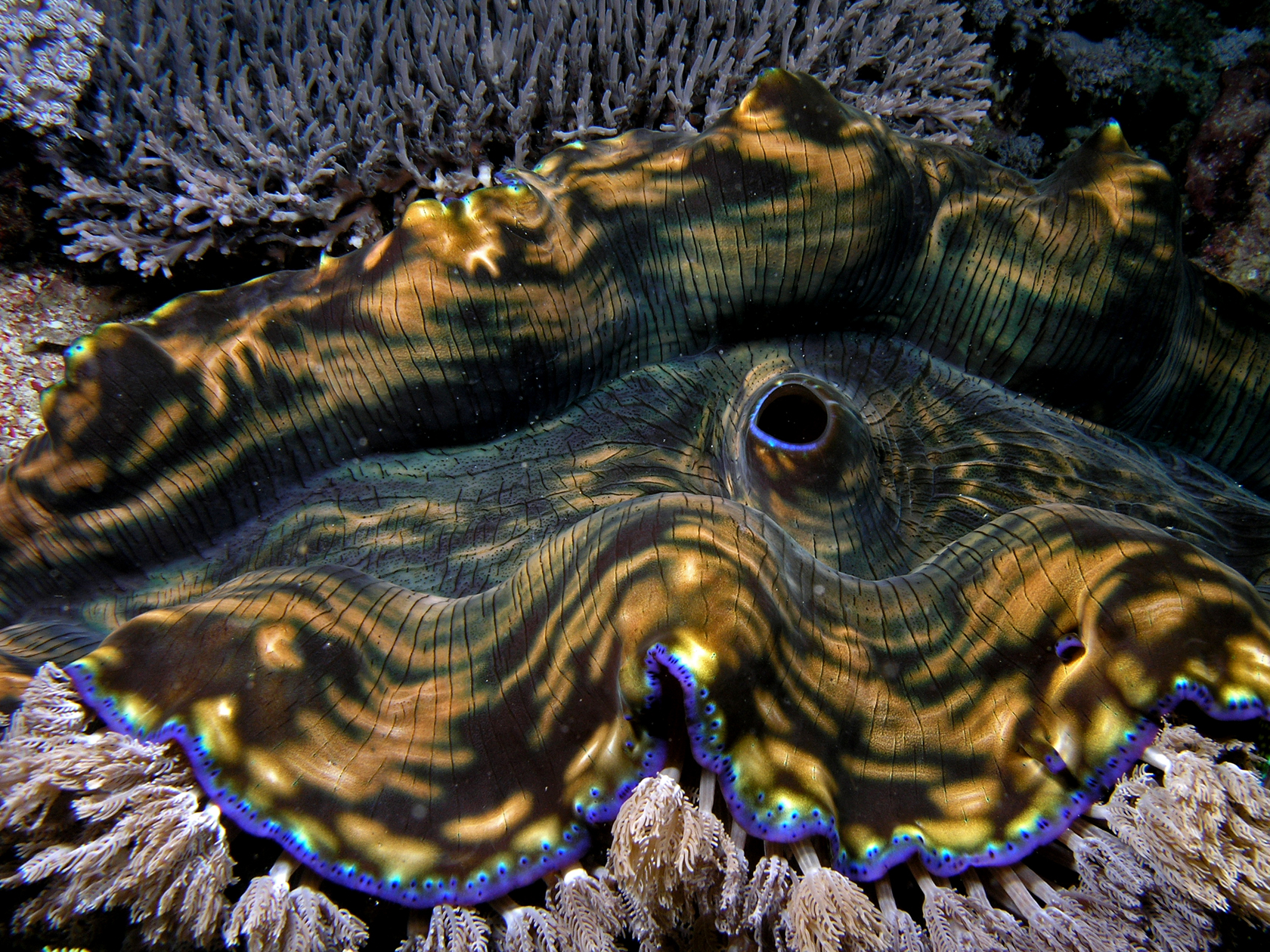
The brightly coloured mantle of a giant clam protects it from bright sunlight.

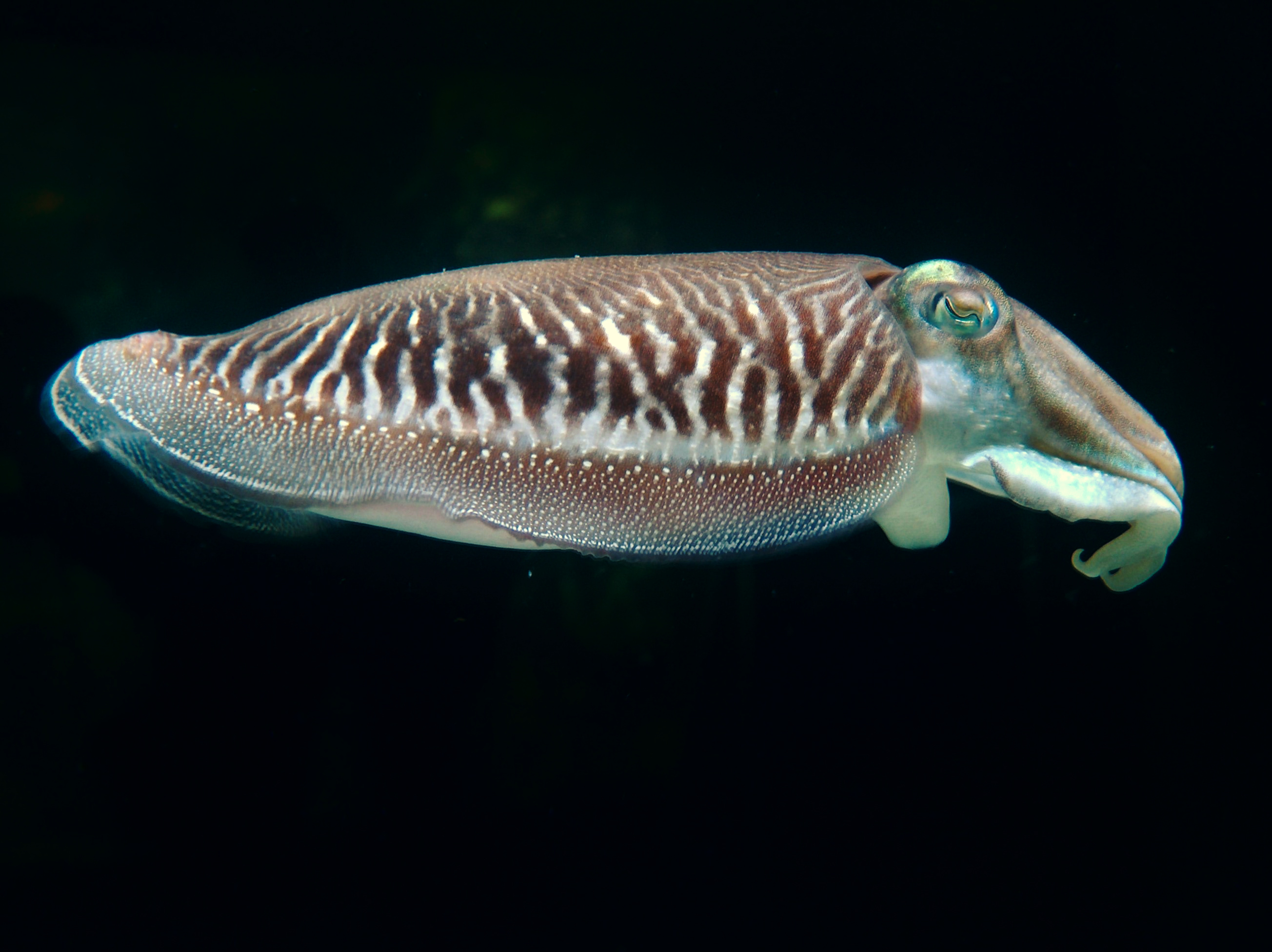
The cuttlefish uses its mantle cavity for jet propulsion

The mantle (also known by the Latin word pallium meaning mantle, robe or cloak, adjective pallial) is a significant part of the anatomy of molluscs: it is the dorsal body wall which covers the visceral mass and usually protrudes in the form of flaps well beyond the visceral mass itself.

In many species of molluscs the epidermis of the mantle secretes calcium carbonate and conchiolin, and creates a shell. In sea slugs there is a progressive loss of the shell and the mantle becomes the dorsal surface of the animal.

The words mantle and pallium both originally meant ‘cloak’ or ‘cape’; see mantle (vesture). This anatomical structure in molluscs often resembles a cloak because in many groups the edges of the mantle, usually referred to as the mantle margin, extend far beyond the main part of the body, forming flaps, double-layered structures which have been adapted for many different uses, including for example, the siphon.

== Mantle cavity ==
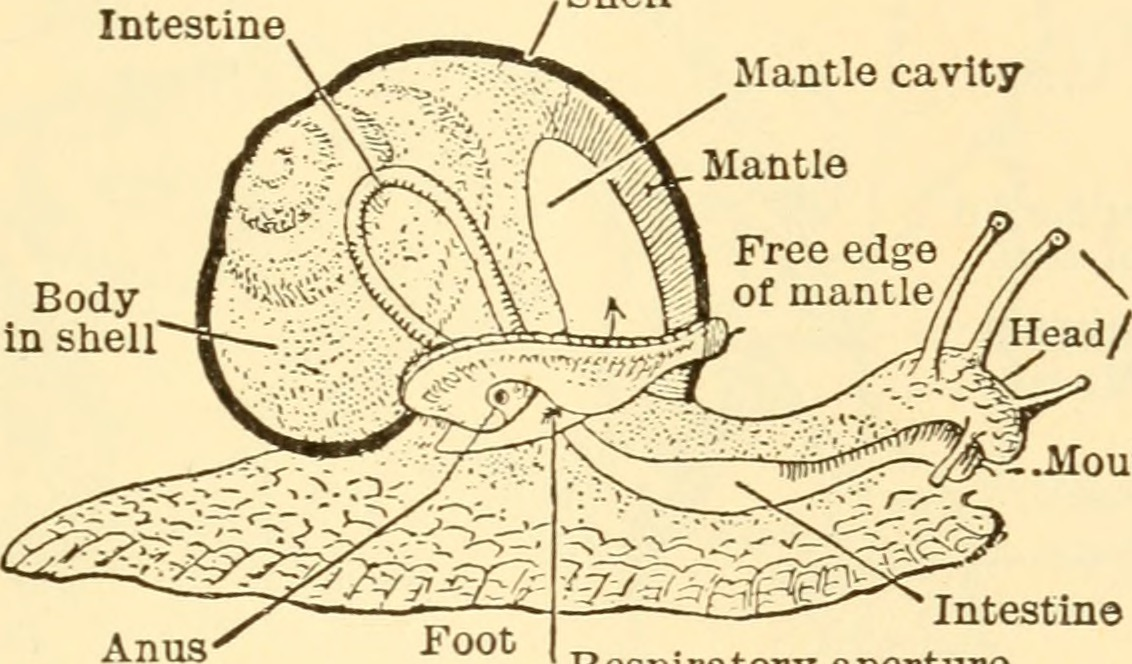
The mantle cavity of a common snail.

The mantle cavity is a central feature of molluscan biology. This cavity is formed by the mantle skirt, a double fold of mantle which encloses a water space. This space contains the mollusk's gills, anus, osphradium, nephridiopores, and gonopores.

The mantle cavity functions as a respiratory chamber in most mollusks. In bivalves it is usually part of the feeding structure. In some mollusks the mantle cavity is a brood chamber, and in cephalopods and some bivalves such as scallops, it is a locomotory organ.

The mantle is highly muscular. In cephalopods the contraction of the mantle is used to force water through a tubular siphon, the hyponome, and this propels the animal very rapidly through the water. In gastropods it is used as a kind of "foot" for locomotion over the surface. In Patella the foot includes the entire ventral surface of the animal. The foot of the Bivalvia is a fleshy process adapted by its form to digging rather than to locomotion.

== Formation of mollusc shell ==
In shelled molluscs, the mantle is the organ that forms the shell, and adds to the shell to increase its size and strength as the animal grows. Shell material is secreted by the ectodermic (epithelial) cells of the mantle tissue.

== Mantle of gastropods ==
The mantle of many gastropods is usually fully or partially hidden inside the gastropod shell.

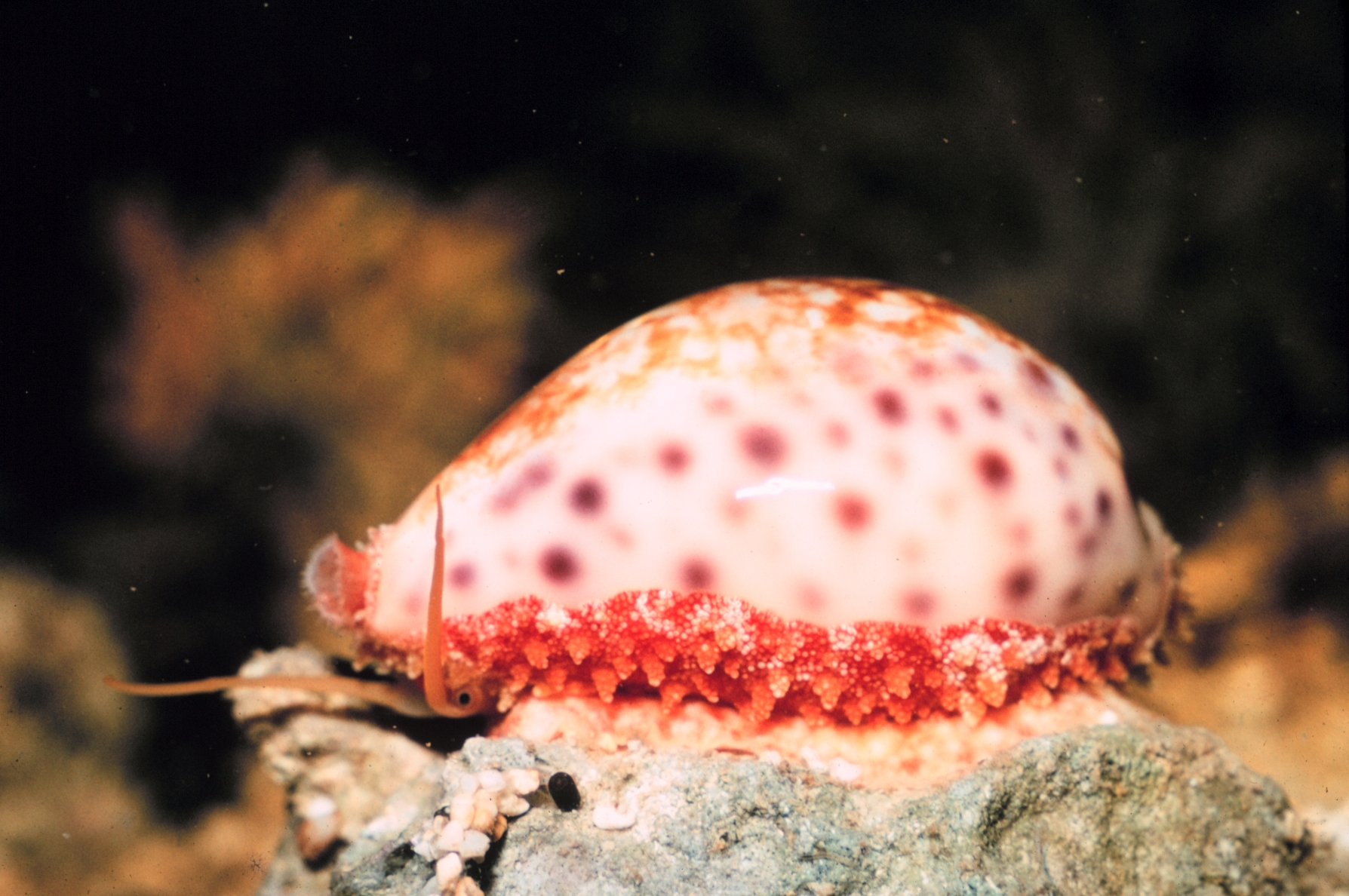
The marine gastropod Cypraea chinensis, the Chinese cowry, showing its partially extended mantle.

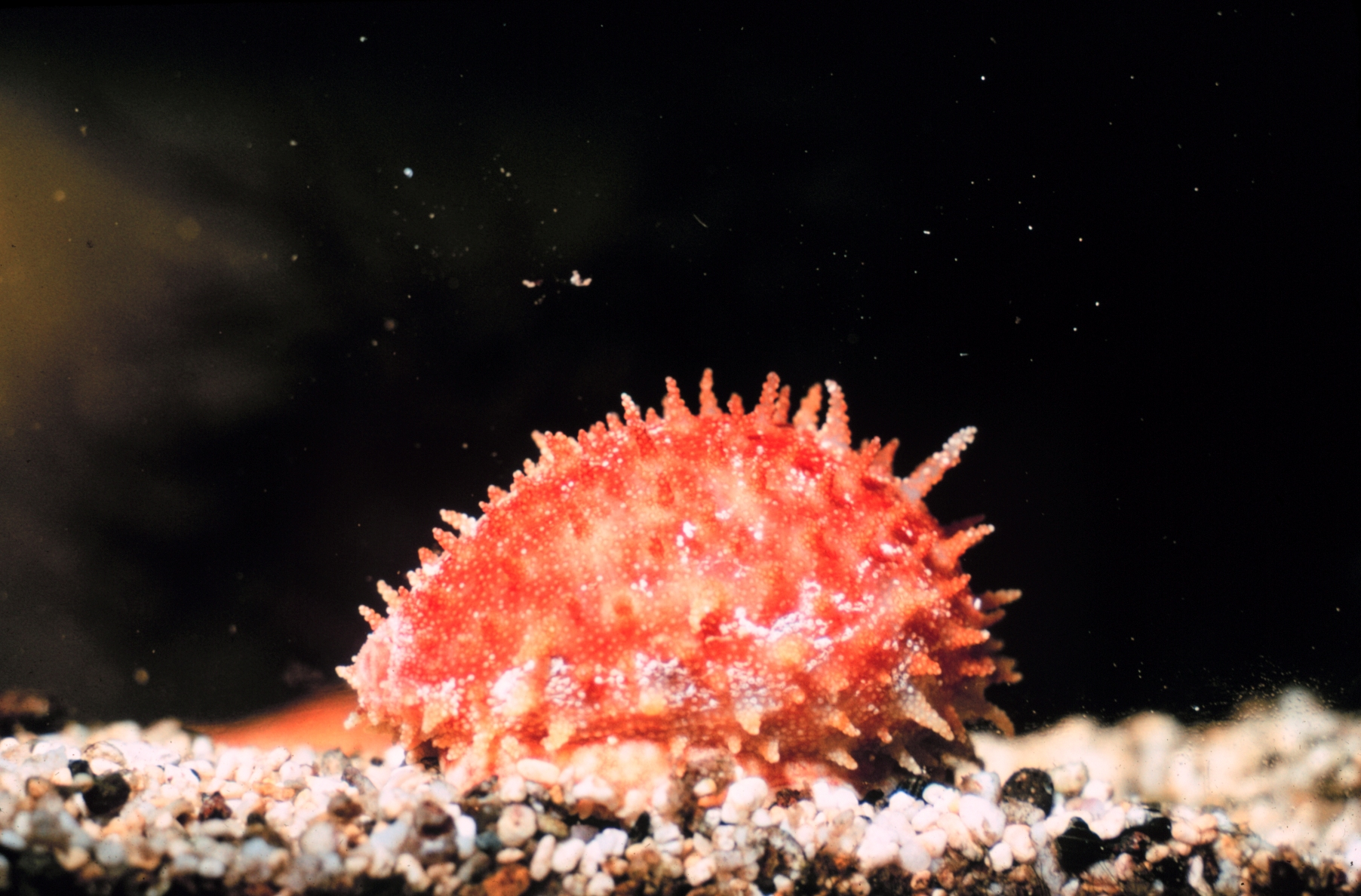
Cypraea chinensis with its mantle fully extended.

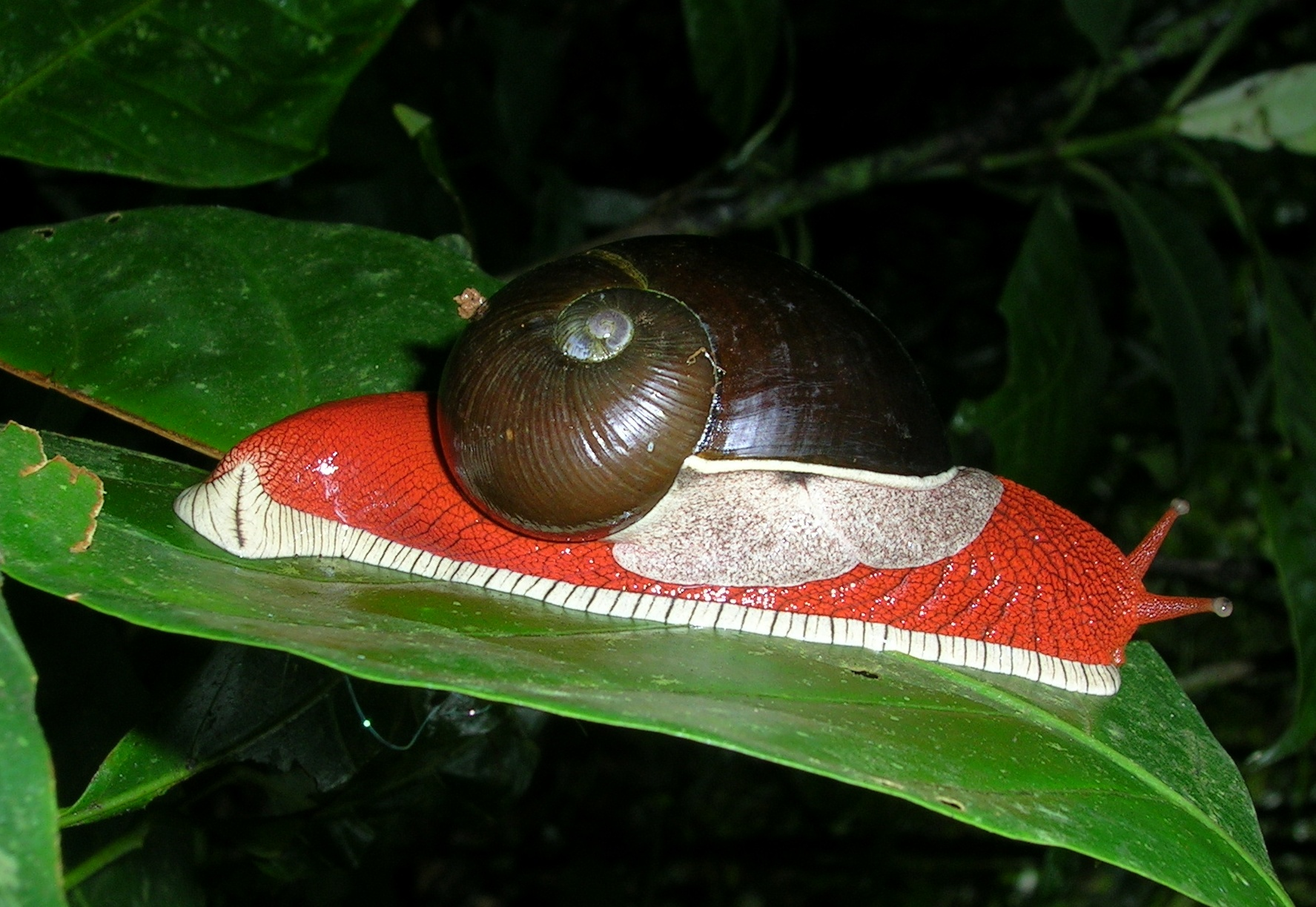
The mantle of the land snail Indrella ampulla is off-white in color and partly visible under the shell. The head and foot are red, and the foot fringe is off-white with narrow black lines.

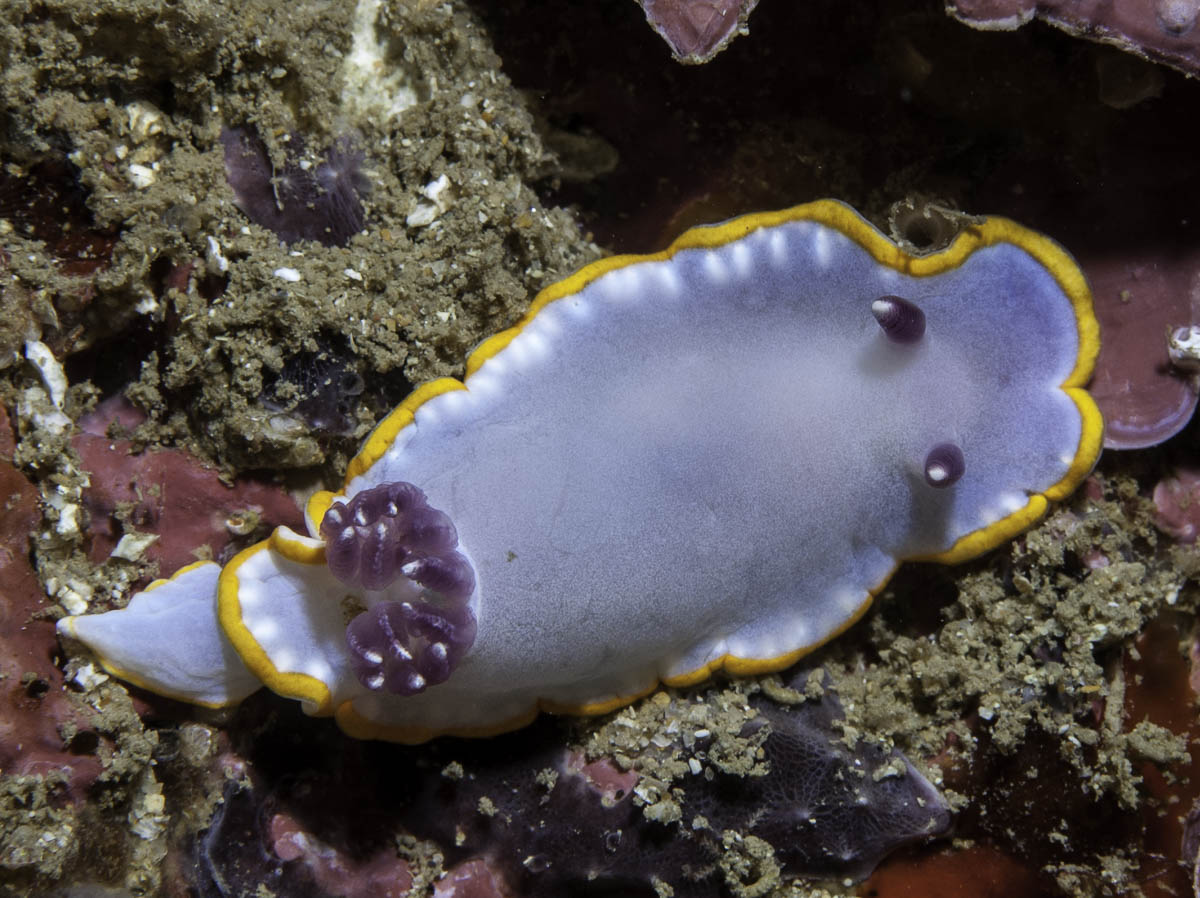
The mantle of the nudibranch Felimida purpurea has a marginal line of orange-yellow colour.

In species where the shell is small compared to the size of the body, more of the mantle shows. Shell-less slugs have the mantle fully visible. The dorsal surface of the mantle is called the notum, while the ventral surface of the mantle is called the hyponotum. In the family Philomycidae, the mantle covers the whole back side of the body.

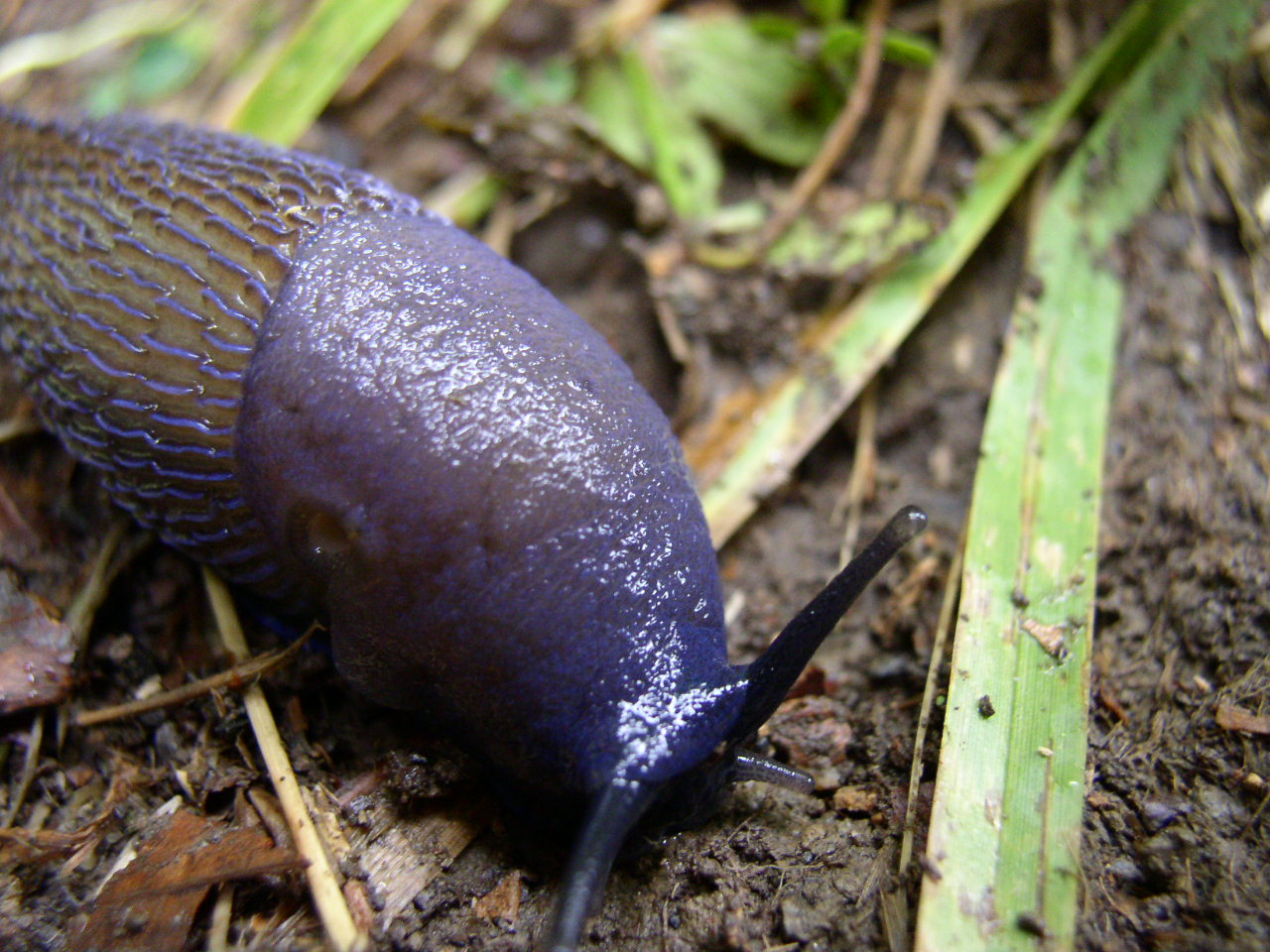
The mantle and the head of this slug Bielzia coerulans is smooth, while the rest of the body is tubercled.

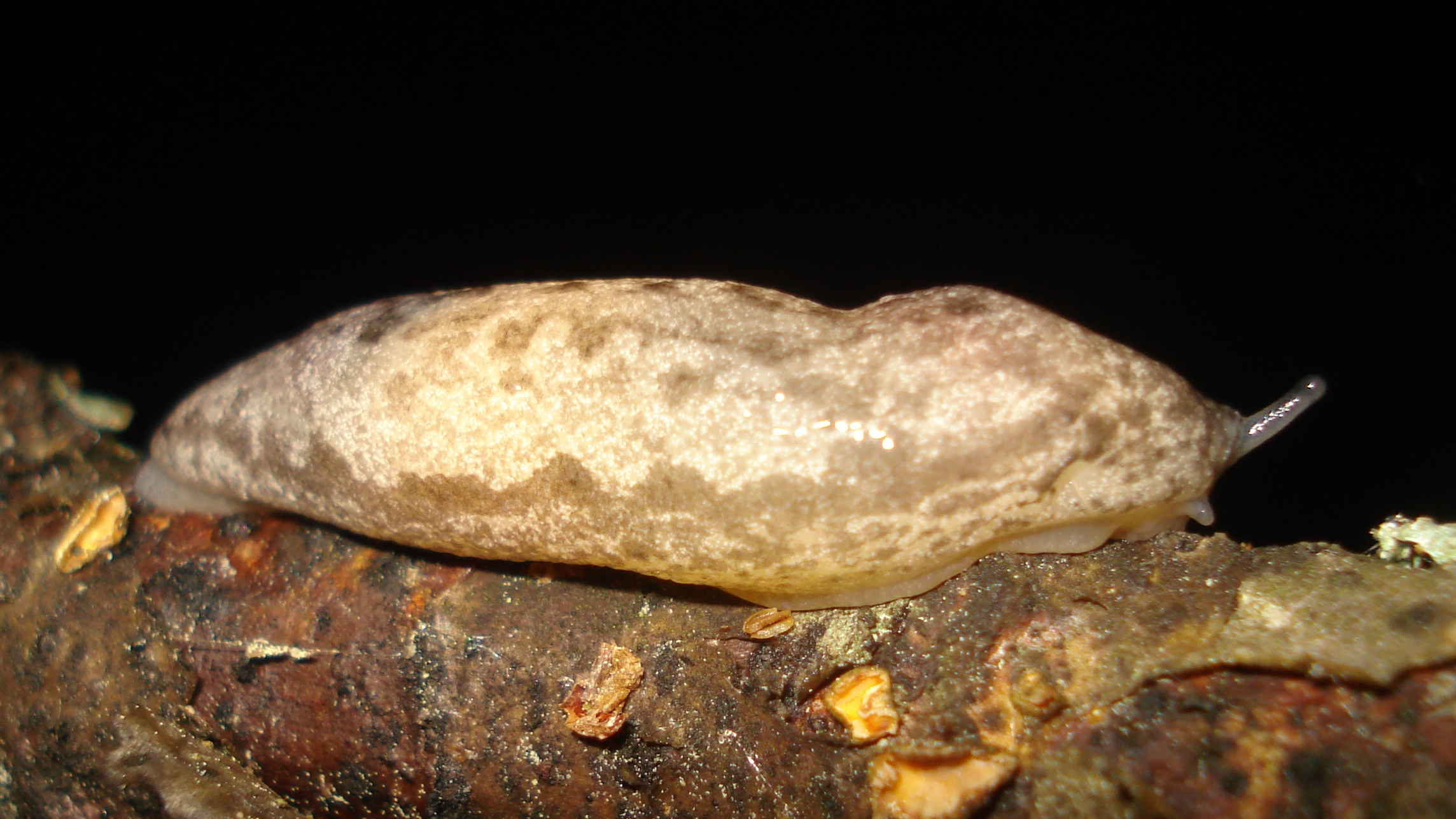
Megapallifera mutabilis from Philomycidae shows enormously developed mantle

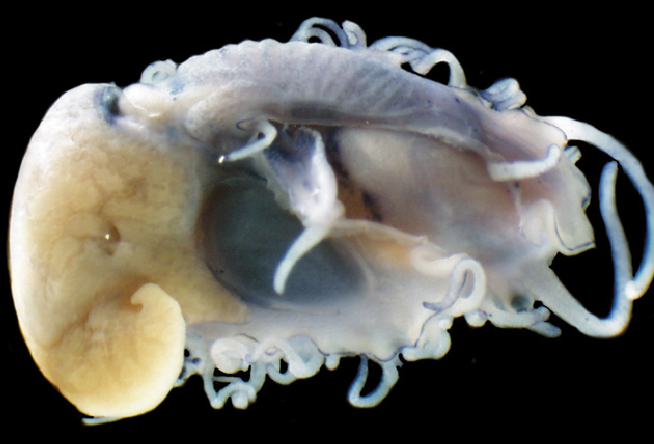
Photo of Haliotis asinina with the shell removed.

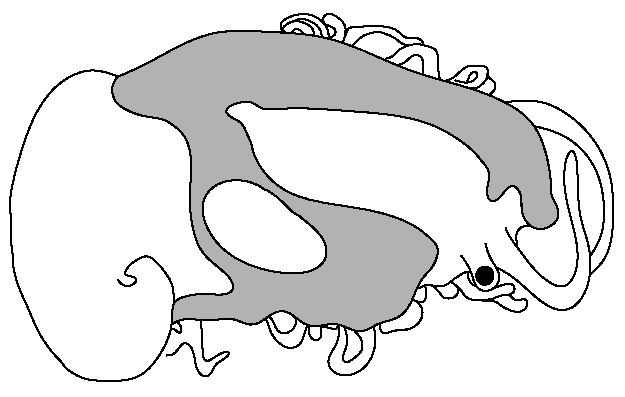
This drawing shows that the mantle (in gray) covers the majority of the dorsal surface of the animal.

== See also ==
- Mollusc shell, which is formed by the mantle
- Siphon, which is a part of the mantle in some groups of molluscs
