= Lucilla de Arcangelis =

Italian physicist

Lucilla de Arcangelis is an Italian statistical physicist known for her work on percolation theory, self-organized criticality, power laws in fracture, and applications including earthquake prediction and neuroscience. She is a professor of theoretical physics at the Mathematics and Physics Department of the Università degli Studi della Campania Luigi Vanvitelli (the University of Campania or Second University of Naples).

== Education and career ==
De Arcangelis earned a laurea from the University of Naples Federico II in 1980. She completed her Ph.D. at Boston University in 1986; her dissertation, Multifractality in Percolation: the Voltage Distribution, was supervised by Sidney Redner.

After postdoctoral or visiting research positions at the University of Cologne, Saclay Nuclear Research Centre, and Forschungszentrum Jülich, she became a researcher for the French National Centre for Scientific Research, working in the Laboratoire Physique et Mécanique des Milieux Hétérogènes at ESPCI Paris, in 1990. She took an associate professorship at the University of L'Aquila in 1993, and moved to the University of Campania in 1996, becoming full professor of the theoretical physics of condensed matter in the Department of Industrial and Information Engineering in 2014.

== Recognition ==
In 2020, de Arcangelis was named a Fellow of the American Physical Society (APS), after a nomination from the APS Division of Computational Physics, for "the discovery of new principles underlying the strong temporal correlations in avalanching critical systems, including fracture of disordered heterogeneous materials, solar flares, earthquakes, and dynamic balance between excitation and inhibition in the brain". She was Elected Member at large of the DCOMP Executive Committee of APS for the term 2022-25. She was Chair of the C3 Statistical Physics Commission of IUPAP for the term 2021-2024. She is President of the Italian Society of Statistical Physics (SIFS).
