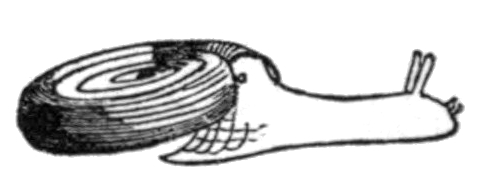
- A live individual of Helicodiscus parallelus

Scientific classification
- Kingdom: Animalia
- Phylum: Mollusca
- Class: Gastropoda
- Order: Stylommatophora
- Infraorder: incertae sedis
- Superfamily: Punctoidea
- Family: Helicodiscidae; H. B. Baker, 1927

= Helicodiscidae =

Family of gastropods

Helicodiscidae is a family of small air-breathing land snails, terrestrial pulmonate gastropod mollusks in the superfamily Punctoidea (according to the taxonomy of the Gastropoda by Bouchet & Rocroi, 2005).

== Genera ==
Genera within the family include:

- Lucilla Lowe, 1852
- Subfamily Helicodiscinae Pilsbry, 1927
  - Chanomphalus Strebel & Pfeffer, 1879
  - Helicodiscus Morse, 1864 - the type genus
  - Polygyriscus Pilsbry, 1948
  - Speleodiscoides A.G. Smith, 1957
- Subfamily Stenopylinae Thiele, 1931
  - Stenopylis Fulton, 1914

Synonyms

- Coarctatio F. Haas, 1945: synonym of Stenopylis Fulton, 1914 (junior synonym)
- Hebetodiscus H. B. Baker, 1929: synonym of Lucilla R. T. Lowe, 1852
- Hydrophrea Climo, 1974: synonym of Lucilla R. T. Lowe, 1852
