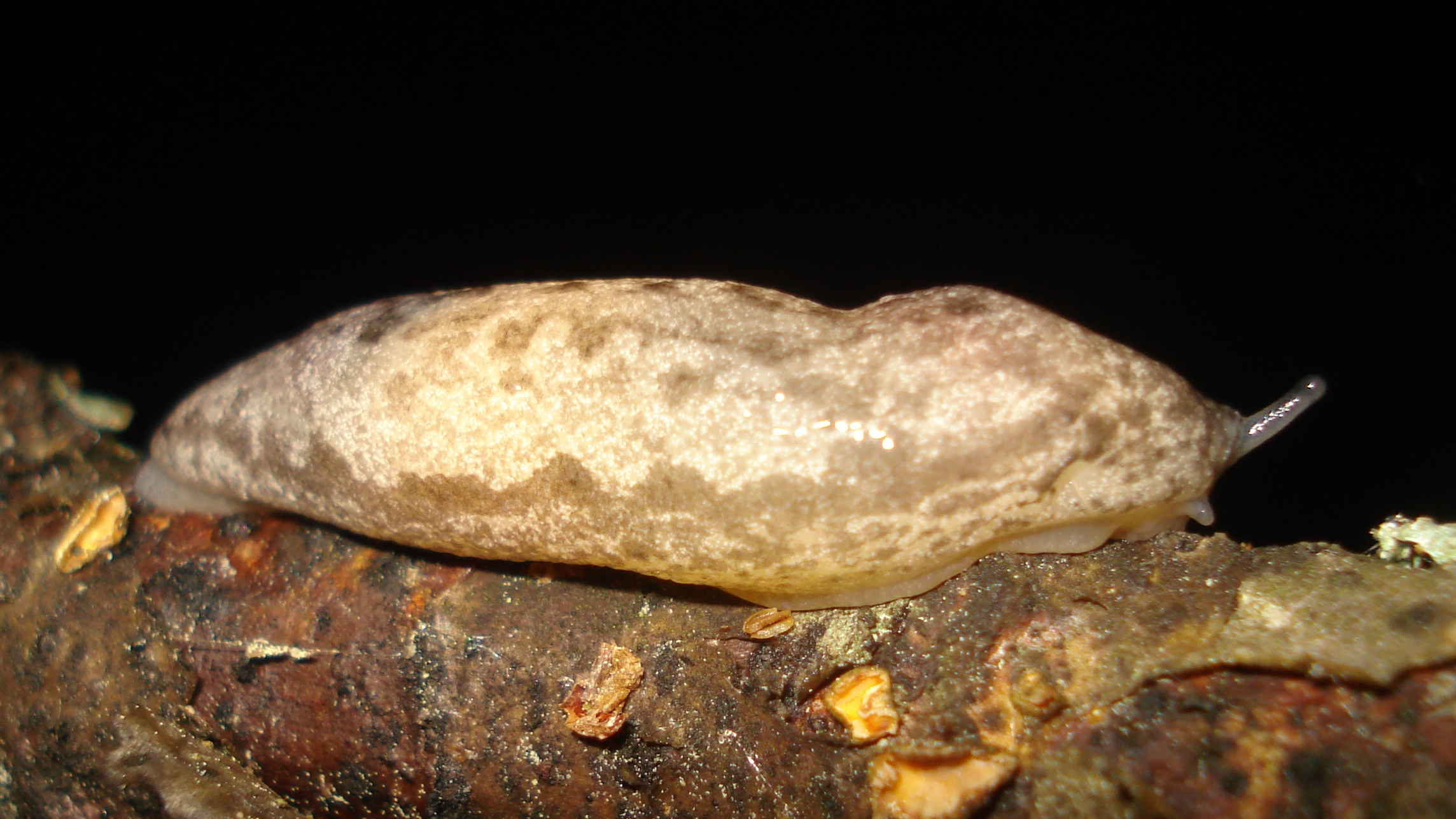
- A live individual of Megapallifera mutabilis in the wild

Scientific classification
- Kingdom: Animalia
- Phylum: Mollusca
- Class: Gastropoda
- Order: Stylommatophora
- Superfamily: Arionoidea
- Family: Philomycidae; Gray, 1847

Genera
- See text

Synonyms
- Tebennophoridae Morse, 1864

= Philomycidae =

Family of gastropods

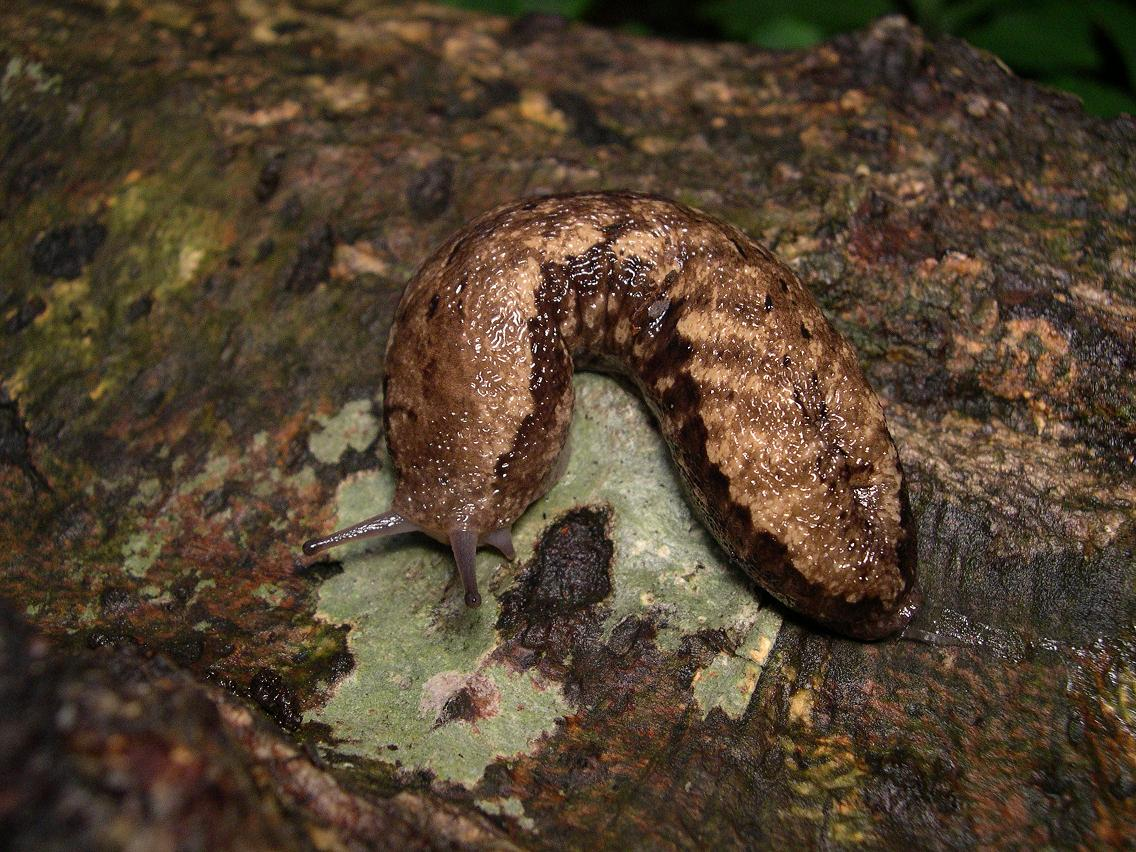
A live individual of Meghimatium fruhstorferi in the wild

Philomycidae are a family of air-breathing land slugs (snails without shells or with only shell remnants). They are terrestrial pulmonate gastropod mollusks in the superfamily Arionoidea (according to the taxonomy of the Gastropoda by Bouchet & Rocroi, 2005).

The family Philomycidae has no subfamilies.

== Distribution ==
Slugs in this family are found in China, Japan, the East Indies, central and eastern North America, and through Central America into northern South America.

== Anatomy ==
Members of this family most obviously differ from related slugs in that their mantles are broadly rounded, and very large, covering the entire body. (In mollusks, the mantle consists of the tissues that normally generate the shell. Being mostly or entirely without shells, most slugs have reduced mantles.)

Pilsbry (1948) stated that "the enormously developed mantle, the large empty shell sac, and the insertions of the free retractor muscles along the margins of the foot cavity, instead of dorsally as in the Arionidae are special to the Philomycidae".

A further anatomical oddity of the group, shared with certain helicid and zonitid snails, is their creation and use of calcareous love darts during mating.

In this family, the number of haploid chromosomes lies between 21 and 30 (according to the values in this table).

== Genera ==
Genera within the family Philomycidae include:

- Megapallifera Hubricht, 1956
- Meghimatium Hasselt, 1823 - synonym: Incilaria Benson, 1842
- Pallifera Morse, 1864
- Philomycus Rafinesque, 1820 - the type genus

== Cladogram ==
A cladogram based on sequences of cytochrome-c oxidase I (COI) genes showing phylogenic relations of genera in the family Philomycidae by Tsai & Wu (2008) (simplified):

- - - - Meghimatium
      - - - - - Philomycus
              - Pallifera
            - Megapallifera
          - Arion
    - Deroceras

Arion and Deroceras were used as outgroup.
