= Geological event =

Occurrence in Earth's history recorded in geological strata

A geological event is a temporary and spatially heterogeneous and dynamic (diachronous) happening in Earth history that contributes to the transformation of Earth system and the formation of geological strata. Event stratigraphy was first proposed as a system for the recognition, study and correlation of the effects of important physical or biological events on the broader stratigraphical record.

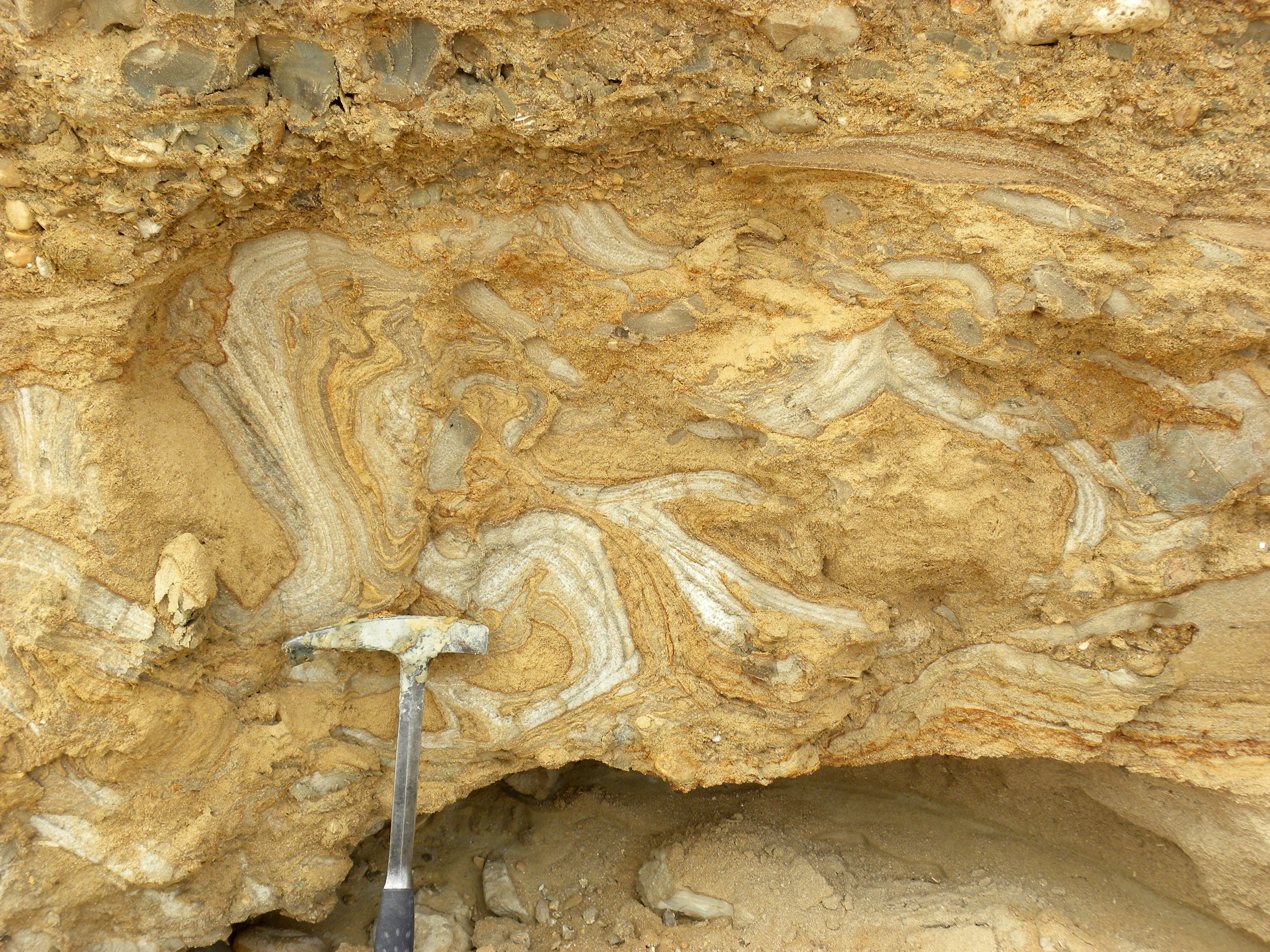
Seismite in Holocene sediments of the Dead Sea basin, Israel. This is a record of an earthquake (a geological event) that disturbed the strata.

Geological events range in time span by orders of magnitude, from seconds to millions of years, and in spatial scale from local to regional and, ultimately, global. In contrast to chronostratigraphic or geochronological units, that define the boundaries between periods, epochs and other units of the geologic time scale, complex dynamic diachronous changes are inherent to the event-stratigraphy paradigm. The lithostratigraphic or biostratigraphic boundaries that mark the onset and termination of geological events in the stratigraphic record may be diachronous, whereas those of formal chronostratigraphic or geochronologic units have basal boundaries that are isochronous.

Examples of geological events include a single footprint, an earthquake, a series of volcanic eruptions, the formation of mountains (orogenies), the Great Oxidation Event (GOE) of 2.4-2.0 billion years ago and the Great Ordovician Biodiversification Event (GOBE) ~500 Ma. The event paradigm is firmly embedded in Quaternary science, as the subdivision of quaternary time is based on the recognition of a succession of climatic events, principally glacial and interglacial cycles but also stadials and interstadials. Highly resolved stratigraphic sequences, such as those from ice cores, provide evidence of much shorter-term millennial-scale climatic events that are superimposed on these broad glacial cycles. Other short-term happenings, such as Dansgaard–Oeschger events and Heinrich events, are evident in ice-core sequences and deep-ocean sediment records, respectively. Some scientists have proposed that the Anthropocene is more consistent with the concept of a geological event than with a formal chronostratigraphic/geochronological unit, such as an epoch of geologic time.
