= Porcellanopagurus edwardsi =

Scientific classification
- Kingdom: Animalia
- Phylum: Arthropoda
- Class: Malacostraca
- Order: Decapoda
- Suborder: Pleocyemata
- Infraorder: Anomura
- Family: Paguridae
- Genus: Porcellanopagurus
- Species: P. edwardsi

Binomial name
- Porcellanopagurus edwardsi Filhol, 1885

Species of crustacean

Porcellanopagurus edwardsi is a species of hermit crab that lives in the waters around New Zealand and its subantarctic islands.

== Distribution ==
Porcellanopagurus edwardsi is found around the Auckland Islands, Campbell Islands, Snares Islands, Stewart Island and along the coast of New Zealand's South Island. The closely related species P. filholi has a more northerly distribution, overlapping with that of P. edwardsi only in the region of the Banks Peninsula. They are benthic, and live at a depth range of 1-120m.

== Taxonomy ==
Porcellanopagurus edwardsi was described by Henri Filhol in 1885 as the only species in a new genus Porcellanopagurus; 12 further species have since been described.

== Life cycle ==
P. edwardsi is mostly gonochoric as most members of the order Decapoda are. When mating, they commonly have a courtship ritual and indirectly transfer sperm.

== Description ==
Unlike most hermit crabs, Porcellanopagurus edwardsi is almost symmetrical, but its abdomen is bent back over the carapace, so that the pleopods are dorsally situated. The abdomen is "grossly distorted", and is usually covered by the shell of a bivalve or limpet, in contrast to the gastropod shell used by most hermit crabs. The cephalothorax is flattened and extends outwards in a number of lobes, the largest of which is the rostrum at the front of the animal.
