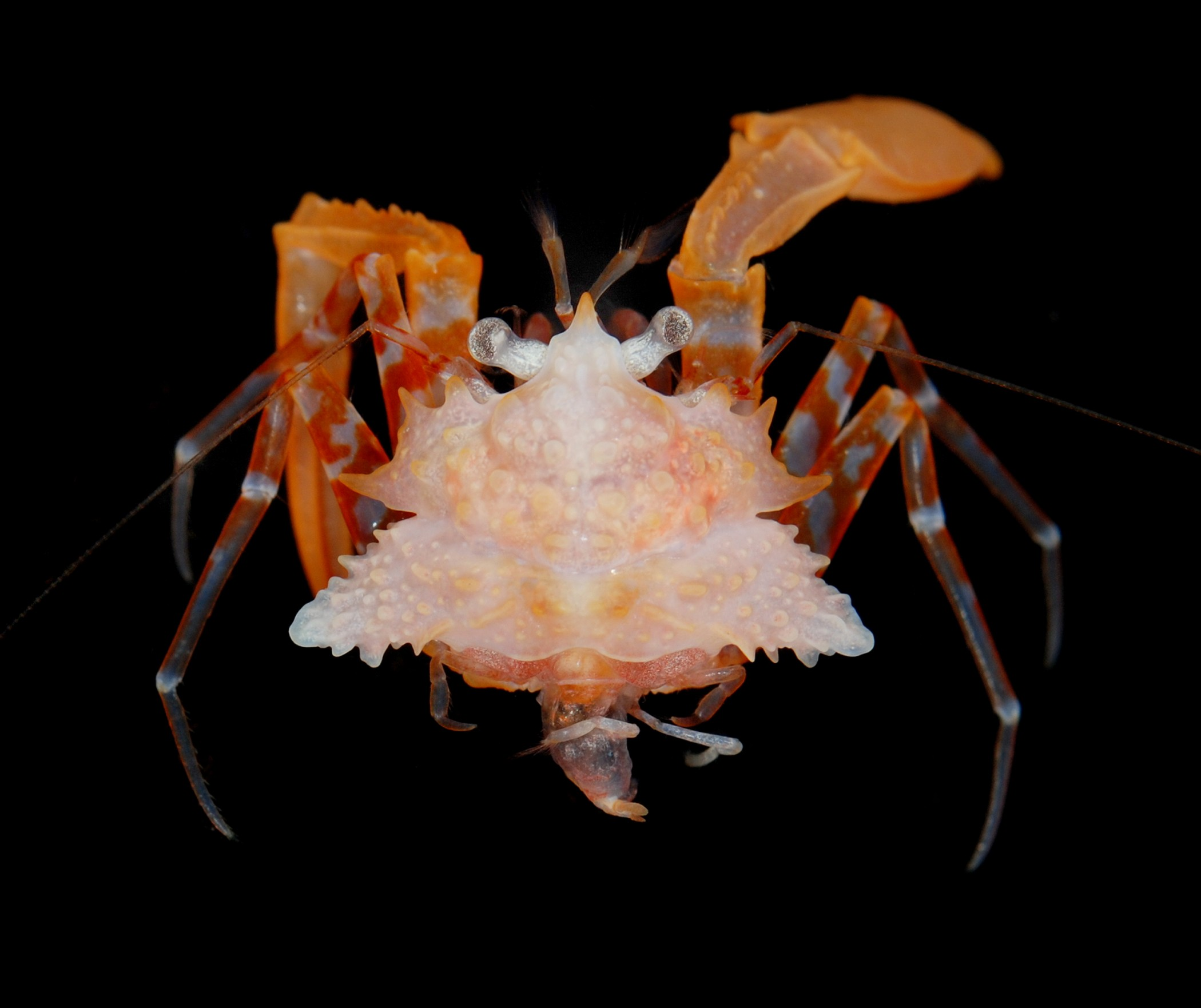
- Holotype male

Scientific classification
- Kingdom: Animalia
- Phylum: Arthropoda
- Clade: Pancrustacea
- Class: Malacostraca
- Order: Decapoda
- Suborder: Pleocyemata
- Infraorder: Anomura
- Family: Paguridae
- Genus: Patagurus; Anker & Paulay, 2013
- Species: P. rex

Binomial name
- Patagurus rex Anker & Paulay, 2013

= Patagurus =

Genus of hermit crab

Patagurus is a monotypic genus of hermit crab, containing just Patagurus rex, that was described from one specimen dredged from the ocean off the coast of French Polynesia. It has independently evolved a hard, protective carapace similar to true crabs, and is an example of carcinization.

== Discovery ==
Patagurus rex was first discovered in 2009 by a dredge collection from a depth of 400 metres (1,300 ft) near Moorea Island, of the French Polynesian Society Islands. The research expedition which collected the crab was organized by the Tropical Deep-Sea Benthos initiative of the Muséum national d'Histoire naturelle in support of the Moorea Biocode Project.

== Description ==
Patagurus rex superficially resembles species of Porcellanopagurus and Solitariopagurus, especially in the sclerotization of the carapace. The most unusual features of this specimen include the almost completely sclerotized carapace, with an abundance of tubercles on dorsal surface and strongly expanded lateral lobes, and a greatly reduced pleon concealed by a small bivalve shell the crab carries. The unique combination of these and other features suggests that this hermit crab represents a distinct lineage in the phylogenetic proximity of Porcellanopagurus and Solitaripagurus. Therefore, the specimen was placed in a new genus, which was formally described in 2013.

== Etymology ==
The genus is named after eminent carcinologist Patsy Ann McLaughlin. The generic name is a combination of McLaughlin's preferred first name and the Greek word pagourus (a kind of crab), which was the origin for the nominal pagurid genus, Pagurus.
