= Evolutionary radiation =

Increase in taxonomic diversity or morphological disparity

Evolutionary radiations during the Phanerozoic.

An evolutionary radiation is an increase in taxonomic diversity that is caused by elevated rates of speciation, that may or may not be associated with an increase in morphological disparity. A significantly large and diverse radiation within a relatively short geologic time scale (e.g. a period or epoch) is often referred to as an explosion. Radiations may affect one clade or many, and be rapid or gradual; where they are rapid, and driven by a single lineage's adaptation to their environment, they are termed adaptive radiations.

== Examples ==
Perhaps the most familiar example of an evolutionary radiation is that of placental mammals immediately after the extinction of the non-avian dinosaurs at the end of the Cretaceous, about 66 million years ago. At that time, the placental mammals were mostly small, insect-eating animals similar in size and shape to modern shrews. By the Eocene (58–37 million years ago), they had evolved into such diverse forms as bats, whales, and horses.

Other familiar radiations include the Avalon Explosion, the Cambrian Explosion, the Great Ordovician Biodiversification Event, the Carboniferous-Earliest Permian Biodiversification Event, the Mesozoic–Cenozoic Radiation, the radiation of land plants after their colonisation of land, the Cretaceous radiation of angiosperms, and the diversification of insects, a radiation that has continued almost unabated since the Devonian, 400 million years ago.

== Types ==
Adaptive radiations involve an increase in a clade's speciation rate coupled with divergence of morphological features that are directly related to ecological habits; these radiations involve speciation not driven by geographic factors and occurring in sympatry; they also may be associated with the acquisition of a key trait. Nonadaptive radiations arguably encompass every type of evolutionary radiation that is not an adaptive radiation, although when a more precise mechanism is known to drive diversity, it can be useful to refer to the pattern as, e.g., a geographic radiation. Geographic radiations involve an increase in speciation caused by increasing opportunities for geographic isolation. Radiations may be discordant, with either diversity or disparity increasing almost independently of the other, or concordant, where both increase at a similar rate. Where the mechanism of diversification is ambiguous and the species seem to be closely related, sometimes the terms "species radiation," "species flock" or "species complex" are used.

== In the fossil record ==
Much of the work carried out by palaeontologists studying evolutionary radiations has been using marine invertebrate fossils simply because these tend to be much more numerous and easy to collect in quantity than large land vertebrates such as mammals or dinosaurs. Brachiopods, for example, underwent major bursts of evolutionary radiation in the Early Cambrian, Early Ordovician, to a lesser degree throughout the Silurian and Devonian, and then again during the Carboniferous and earliest Permian. During these periods, different species of brachiopods independently assumed a similar morphology, and presumably mode of life, to species that had lived millions of years before. This phenomenon, known as homeomorphy, is explained by convergent evolution: when subjected to similar selective pressures, organisms will often evolve similar adaptations. Further examples of rapid evolutionary radiation can be observed among ammonites, which suffered a series of extinctions from which they repeatedly re-diversified; and trilobites which, during the Cambrian, rapidly evolved into a variety of forms occupying many of the niches exploited by crustaceans today.

== Recent examples ==
A number of groups have undergone evolutionary radiation in relatively recent times. The cichlids in particular have been much studied by biologists. In places such as Lake Malawi they have evolved into a very wide variety of forms, including species that are filter feeders, snail eaters, brood parasites, algal grazers, and fish-eaters. Caribbean anoline lizards are another well-known example of an adaptive radiation. Grasses have been a success, evolving in parallel with grazing herbivores such as horses and antelope.

== See also ==
- Evolutionary fauna
- Adaptive radiation
- Nonadaptive radiation
