= Carcinisation =

Evolution of crustaceans into crab-like forms

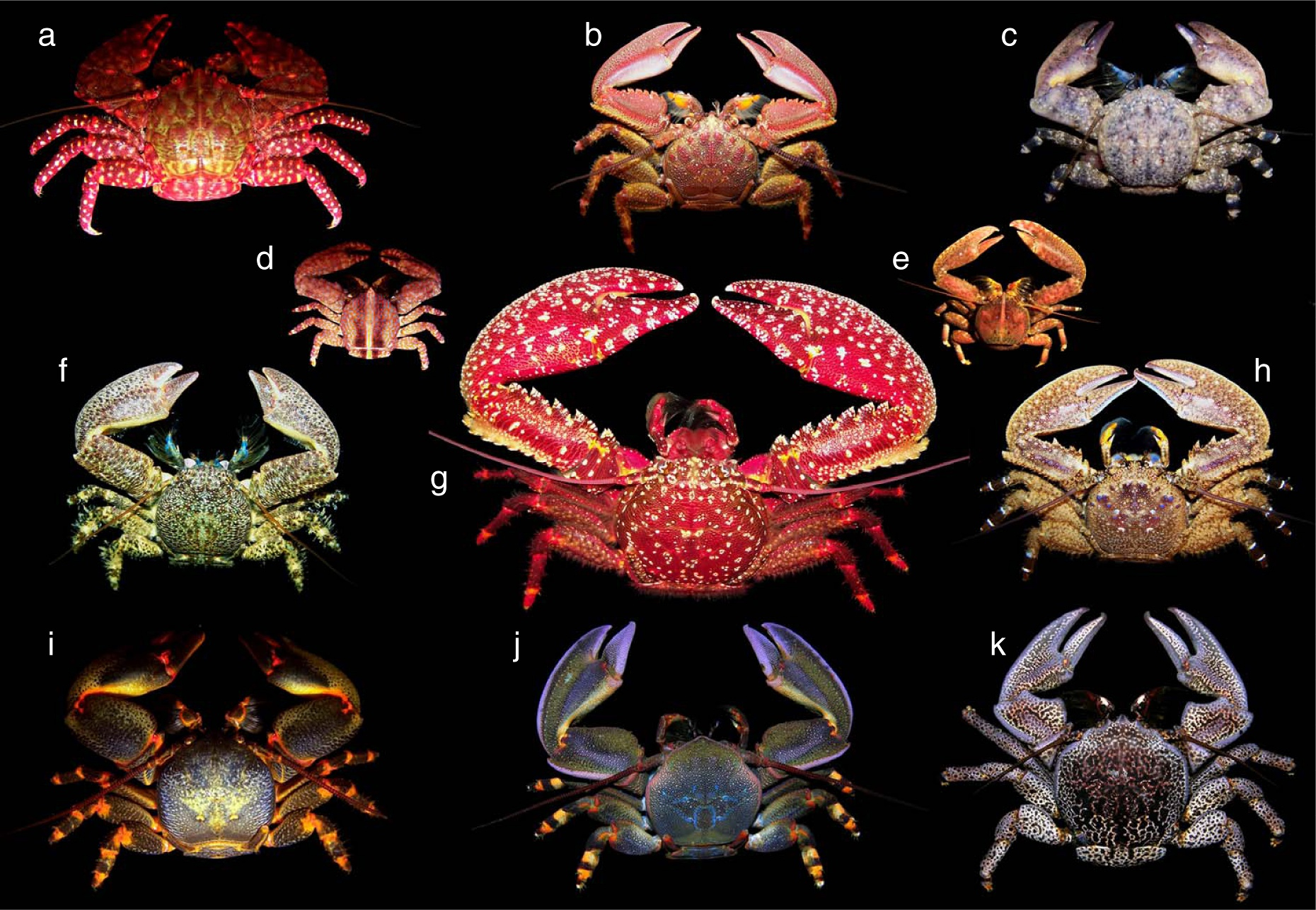
Porcelain crabs resemble true crabs, but are more closely related to squat lobsters and hermit crabs.

Carcinisation or carcinization is a form of convergent evolution in which non-crab crustaceans evolve a crab-like body plan. The term was introduced into evolutionary biology by Lancelot Alexander Borradaile, who described it in 1916 as "the many attempts of Nature to evolve a crab".

Carcinisation has been observed most often in species of infraorder Anomura, and is characterized by a flattened and widened carapace, fused sternites, and a bent and flattened pleon. It is hypothesized to offer the selective advantages of protecting vital organs and allowing organisms to more easily escape predators on the ocean floor.

An obscure phenomenon for much of the time since its discovery, carcinisation has become more widely known since 2019, having been the subject of a popular internet meme.

== Definition ==
The term was introduced by Lancelot Alexander Borradaile in 1916, with the words:

the phenomenon which may be called "carcinization" … consists essentially in a reduction of the abdomen of a macrurous crustacean, together with a depression and broadening of its cephalothorax, so that the animal assumes the general habit of body of a crab

Keiler et al., 2017 defines a carcinised morphology as follows:

- "The carapace is flatter than it is broad and possesses lateral margins."
- "The sternites are fused into a wide sternal plastron which possesses a distinct emargination on its posterior margin."
- "The pleon is flattened and strongly bent, in dorsal view completely hiding the tergites of the fourth pleonal segment, and partially or completely covers the plastron."

Carcinised (crab) body plan, its adaptations illustrated by comparison with a lobster (undersides shown)

== Taxonomic range ==
Carcinisation has occurred independently in at least five groups of extant decapod crustaceans:

- Infraorder Anomura:
  - King crabs, which most scientists believe evolved from hermit crab ancestors, first appearing in the Late Cenozoic
  - Porcelain crabs, closely related to squat lobsters, first appearing in the Late Jurassic
  - The hairy stone crab (Lomis hirta)
  - Hermit crabs:
    - The coconut crab (Birgus latro)
    - Patagurus rex
- Infraorder Brachyura (true crabs) First appearance: Early Jurassic

- Decapoda
  - Brachyura
    ("true" crabs)
  - Anomura
    - - Porcellanidae (porcelain crabs)
      - Munididae (squat lobsters)
    - - - Parapaguridae (deep water sea anemone hermit crabs)
        - - Lomisidae (hairy stone crabs)
          - Aeglidae
      - - Hippidae (mole crabs or sand crabs)
        - Paguroidea
          - Lithodidae (king crabs)
          - Paguridae
            - Birgus latro (coconut crab)
            - Patagurus rex
            - (other hermit crabs)

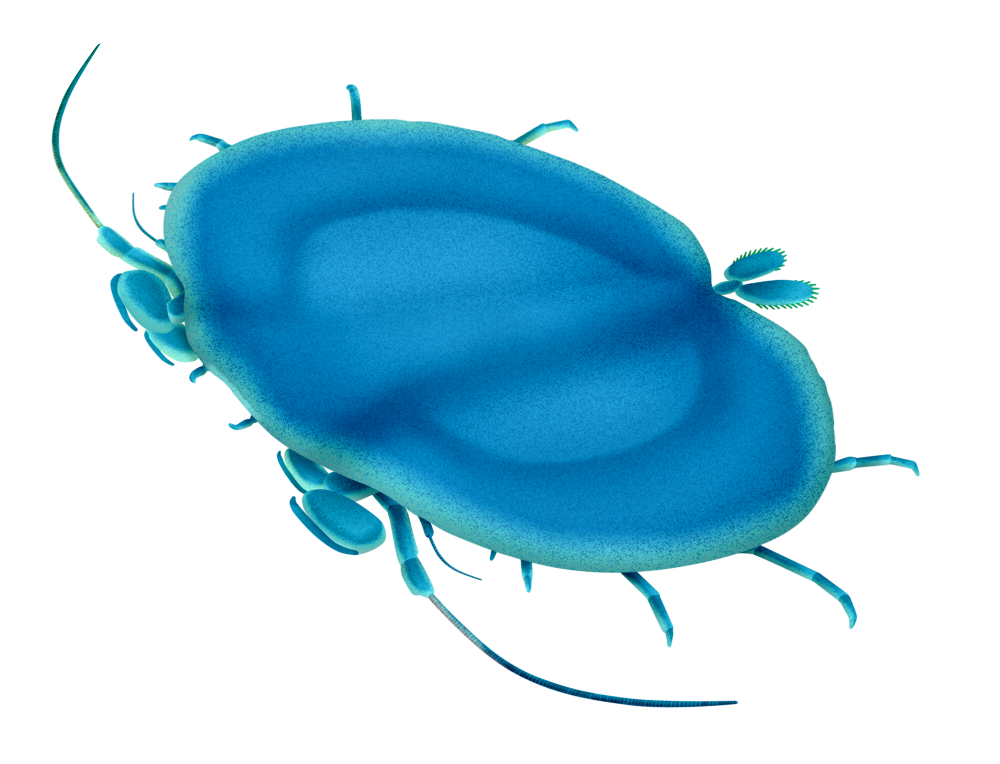
The cyclidan Brittaniclus rankini

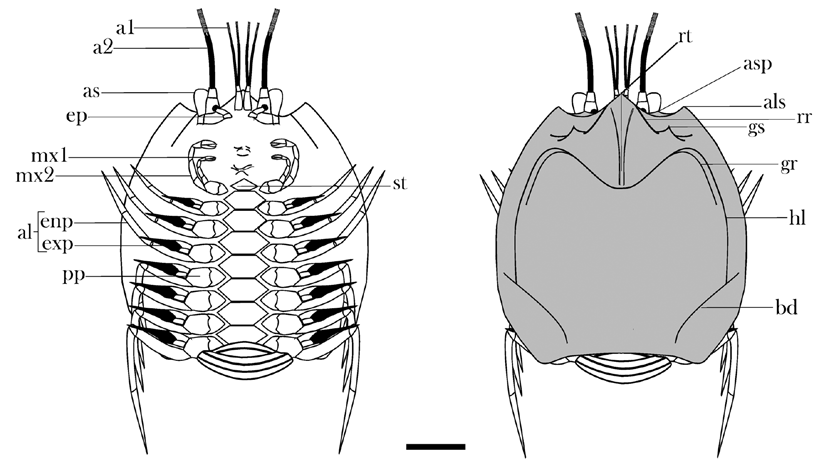
The pygocephalomorph Iraticaris damianii, from the Irati Formation, in southern Brazil

The extinct probable crustacean order Cyclida greatly resemble crabs, and probably had a similar ecology.

The pygocephalomorph Iraticaris damianii is significantly carcinised, with a pleon only ⅐ the length of the cephalothorax that is folded ventrally, covering the posterior margin of the final (eighth) thoracic sternite, as well as a roughly oval flattened carapace that is only slightly longer than it is wide. A trend within pygocephalans is reported where later species tend to have a more bent pleon; it is extended or partially bent in Carboniferous taxa, while most Permian species have it fully curved. Iraticaris is the most developed known species in this sense.

The evolution of king crabs (family Lithodidae) from hermit crabs has been well studied, and evidence in their biology supports this theory. For example, most hermit crabs are asymmetrical, and fit well into spiral snail shells; the abdomens of king crabs, even though they do not use snail shells for shelter, are also asymmetrical.

An exceptional form of carcinisation, termed "hypercarcinisation", is seen in the porcelain crab Allopetrolisthes spinifrons. In addition to the shortened body form, A. spinifrons shows similar sexual dimorphism to that seen in true crabs, where males have a shorter pleon than females.

== Selective pressures and benefits ==
Independently arising from multiple ancestral crustacean taxa, the crab-like traits exhibited vary between individual species and taxa. However, all crabs and carcinised organisms are decapods. Correlations between the folding of the pleon tail and widening of the cephalothorax across disparate decapod species suggest similar evolutionary pressures. Some occurrences of carcinisation are derived from convergent but distinct developmental pathways, while others may be instances of homologous parallelism from shared ancestral body plans.

Most carcinised organisms are descended from the infraorder Anomura, which includes hermit crabs. Many carcinised Anomura evolved from ancestors with morphologically intermediate forms reminiscent of modern squat lobsters.

The adoption of a crab-like body structure can bring several selective advantages for crustacean species. Carcinisation yields a lowered center of gravity, allowing these creatures to invest in sideways walking. This evasive adaptation is particularly useful in an ocean environment with forward-moving predators. The pleon is held tightly under the animal's cephalothorax with reduced musculature, which protects the pleon's organs from attack. The smaller and more balanced frame facilitates concealment within rocks and coral.

The caridoid escape reaction is an innate danger response in crustaceans such as lobsters and crayfish, which contracts abdominal flexions and sends the crustacean flying backward in the water. Brachyura and species which have undergone carcinisation have strongly bent and immobile tails, which prevent them from using this evasion strategy. The necessary muscles are no longer developed enough in these species to facilitate the necessary tail flipping. Crabs and false crabs are best suited to escape by ground pursuit.

Porcelain crabs' closest relatives are galatheoid squat lobsters, taxa which occupy a morphological middle ground, described by Keiler et al. as "half-carcinized" due to their partially flexed pleons and carapaces that remain longer than they are wide. Many species do not become fully carcinised but only undergo the crab-like adaptations that are contextually beneficial, to varying degrees.

While most incidences of carcinisation are in aquatic Anomura populations, it has evolved in the planet's largest land-dwelling invertebrate, coconut crabs. A number of true crab-like features, such as a wide carapace, and a low abdomen with strong supporting legs, allow these crustaceans to wield muscular claws and manipulate their terrestrial environments with greater ease. The lack of an extended pleon greatly benefits their mobility. In this case, brachyuriform traits accommodate comfortable terrestrial locomotion and are far more pronounced in maturity, after the larval and post-larval stages which remain obligatorily aquatic. The repeated emergence of carcinised morphological structures suggests that selective pressures in various Anomura niches and habitats often lead to carcinisation.

== Decarcinisation ==
Some crab-shaped species have evolved away from the crab form in a process called decarcinisation. Decarcinisation, or the loss of the crab-like body, has occurred multiple times in both Brachyura and Anomura. However, there are varying degrees of carcinisation and decarcinisation. Thus, not all species can necessarily be distinctly classified as "carcinised" or "decarcinised". For example, some hermit crabs have lost or reduced their outer casings or "domiciles". While they retain their crab-like phenotype, their reduction in or lack of domicile necessitates a "semi-carcinised" label.

Examples of extreme decarcinisation include the brachyuran frog crabs and fossil Callichimaera perplexa, and porcellanid genera including Euceramus.

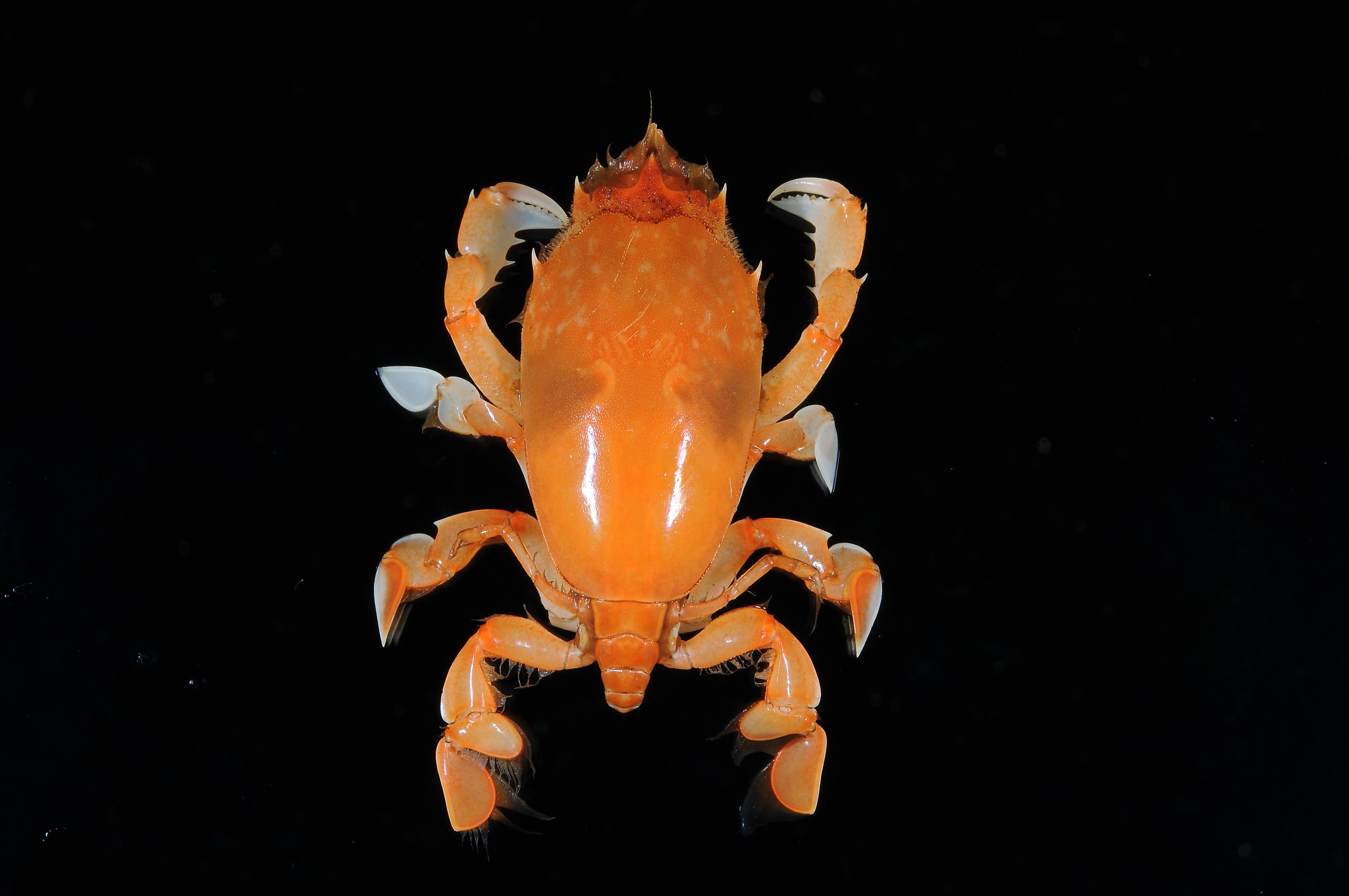
A raninid true crab preserved specimen.

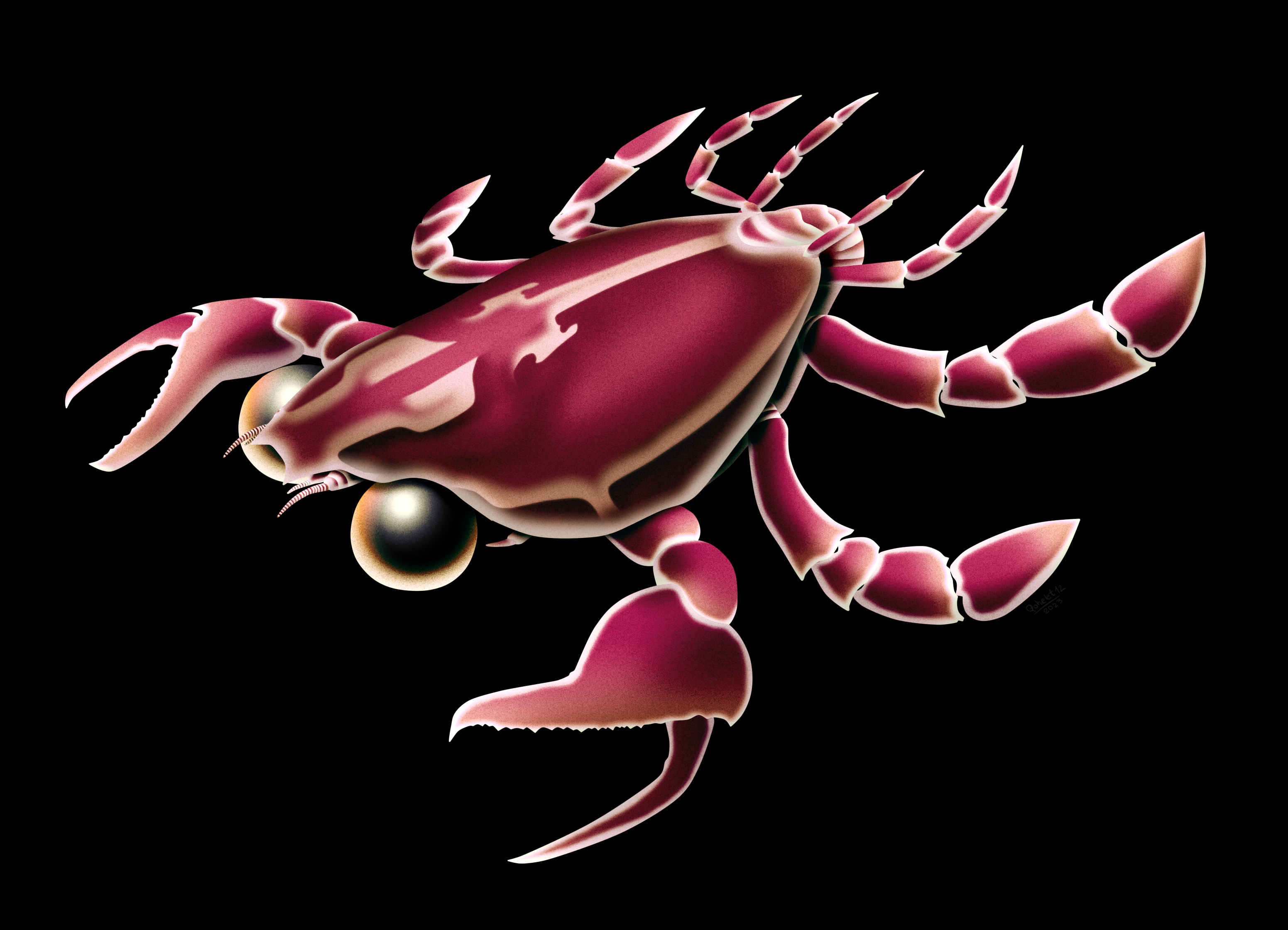
A reconstruction of the Cretaceous true crab Callichimaera perplexa.

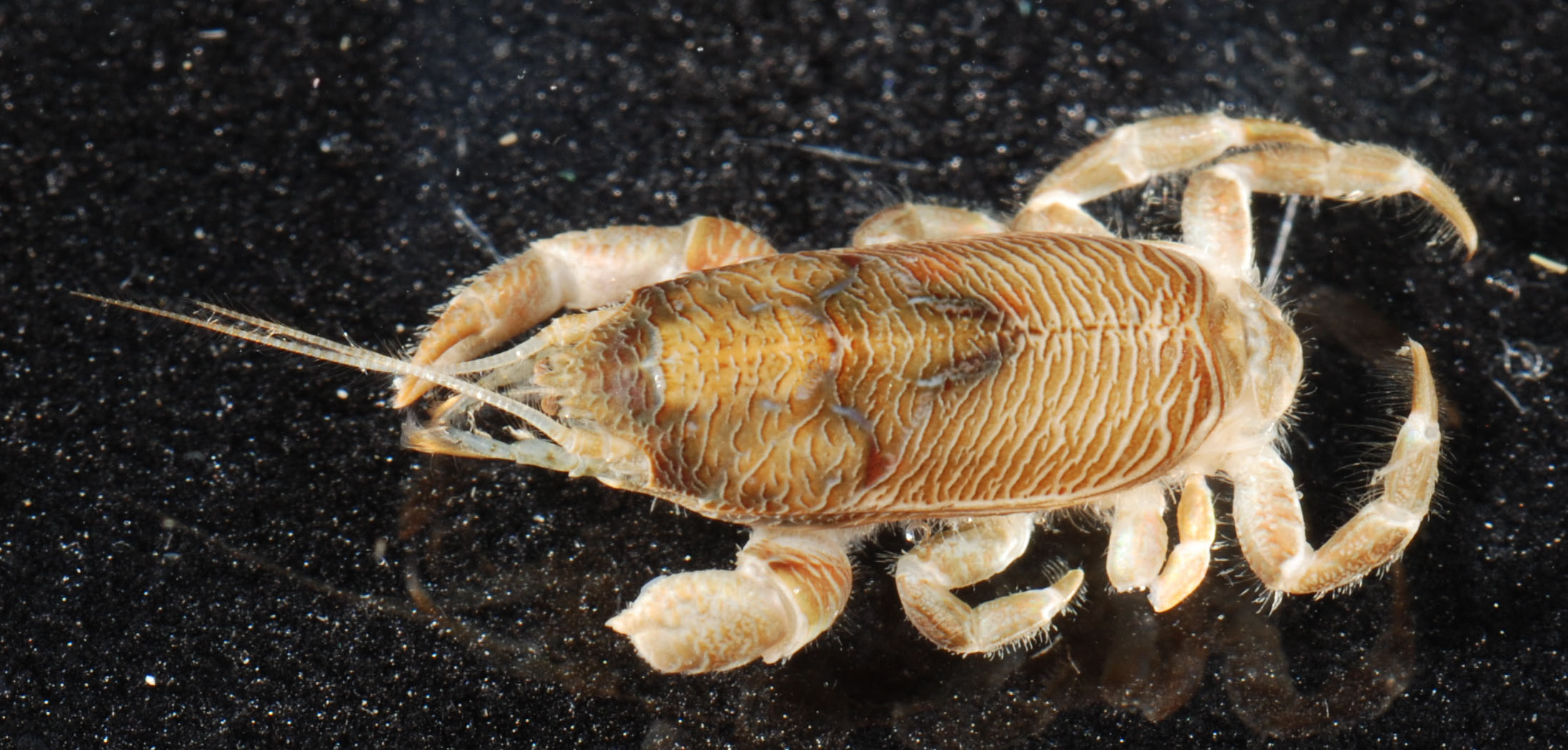
The olivepit porcelain crab Euceramus praelongus.

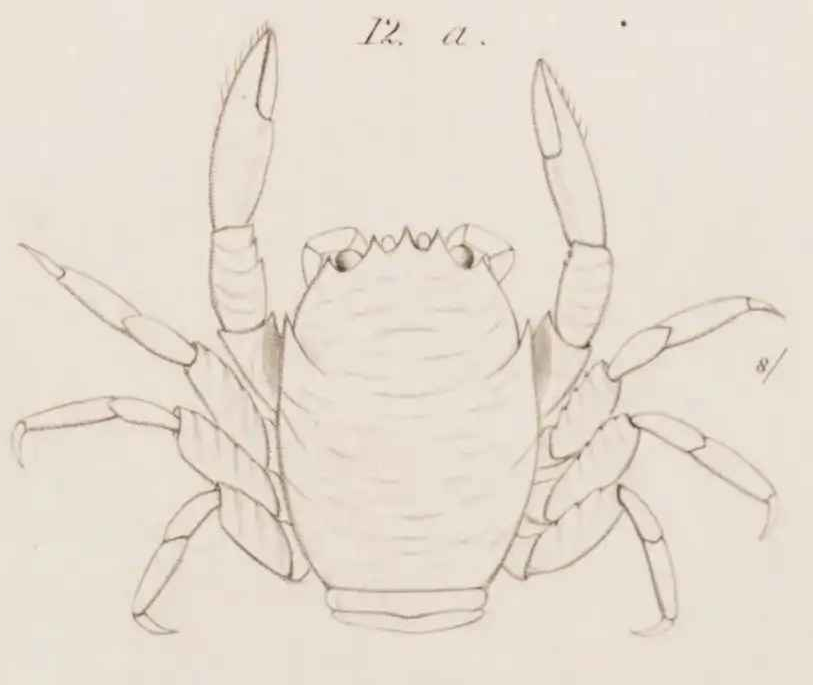
An illustration of the porcellanid Minyocerus angustus (=Porcellana angusta).

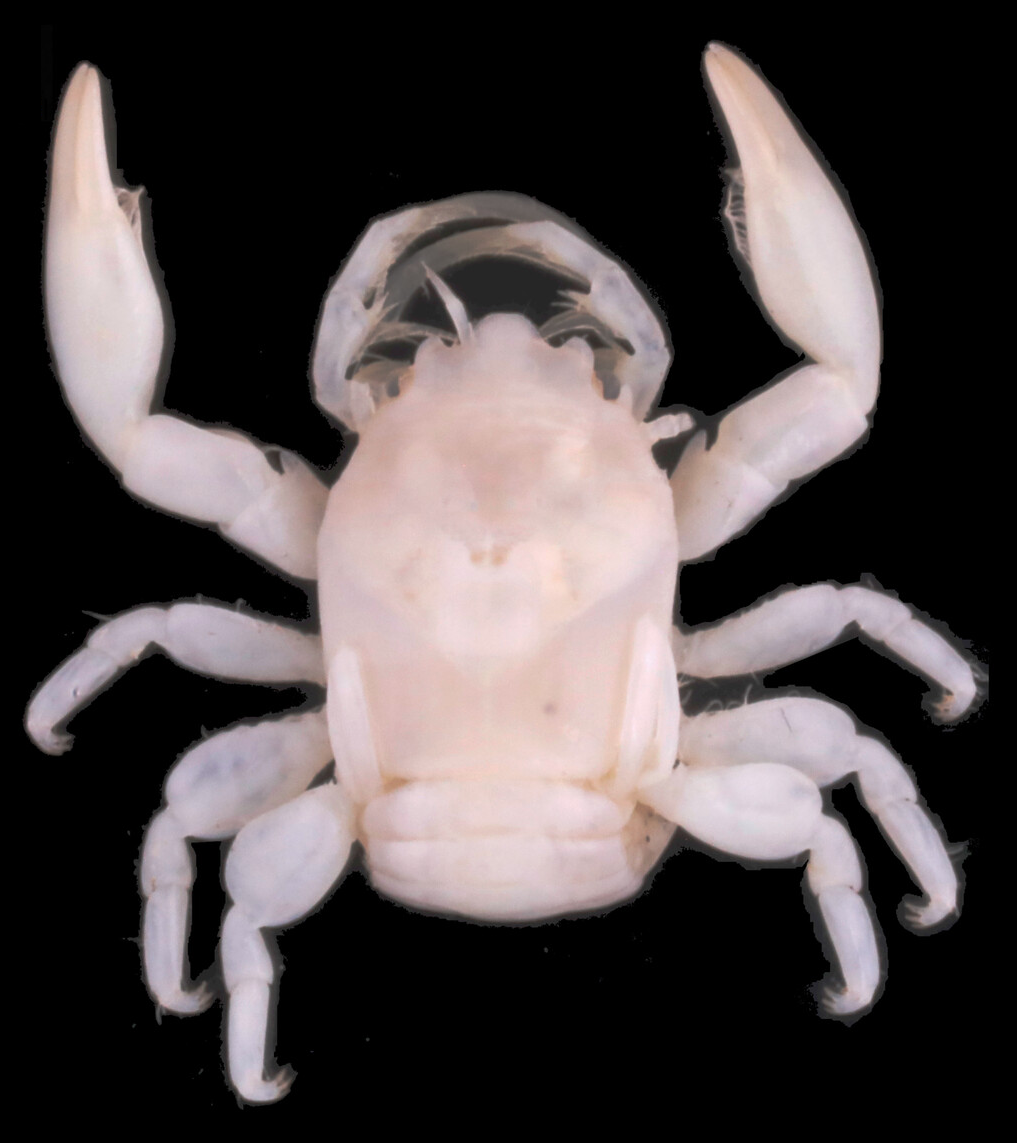
Dorsal view of Porcellanella brevidentata, museum collection specimen WAMC73614 (holotype).

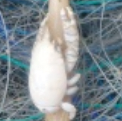
Pseudoporcellanella manoliensis clinging to a sea pen (Scytalium sp.).

== Cultural impact ==
Beginning in 2019, carcinisation has found popularity as an internet meme. This parodies carcinisation, purporting that crabs possess the "ideal body plan" and conceptualizing the evolution of other animal groups, especially vertebrates, of eventually developing crab-like bodies (often being examples of speculative evolution). There are concerns that this may promote misunderstandings of biology and evolution. The evolutionary palaeobiologist Matthew Wills comments that while multiple groups have converged on a crablike body plan, and despite the meme, humans are not about to evolve the same way. This is because all the crabs are decapods, and the evolutionary pressures for carcinization only apply in a marine environment where defence, living in crevices, and being wave-swept favour armoured protection, a broad compact body, and the ability to scuttle sideways.

== See also ==
- Cretaceous crab revolution – Evolutionary diversification event during the Cretaceous period
- List of examples of convergent evolution – Examples of separate lineages of organisms developing similar characteristics
- Mesozoic marine revolution – Evolutionary arms race
- Orthogenesis – Hypothesis that organisms have an innate tendency to evolve towards some goal
