= Haigiopagurus diegensis =

Scientific classification
- Domain: Eukaryota
- Kingdom: Animalia
- Phylum: Arthropoda
- Class: Malacostraca
- Order: Decapoda
- Suborder: Pleocyemata
- Infraorder: Anomura
- Family: Paguridae
- Genus: Haigiopagurus
- Species: H. diegensis

Binomial name
- Haigiopagurus diegensis (Scanland & Hopkins, 1969)

Synonyms
- Haigia diegensis (Scanland & Hopkins, 1969); Pylopagurus diegensis Scanland & Hopkins, 1969

Species of fly

Haigiopagurus diegensis is a species of hermit crab in the genus Haigiopagurus of the family Paguridae.
