= Great Ordovician Biodiversification Event =

Evolutionary radiation of marine animal life throughout the Ordovician period

The Great Ordovician Biodiversification Event (GOBE) was an evolutionary radiation of marine animal life throughout the Ordovician period, 40 million years after the Cambrian explosion, whereby the distinctive Cambrian fauna fizzled out to be replaced with a Paleozoic fauna rich in suspension feeder and pelagic animals.

It followed a series of Cambrian–Ordovician extinction events, and the resulting fauna went on to dominate the Palaeozoic oceans relatively unchanged. Marine diversity increased to levels typical of the Palaeozoic, and morphological disparity was similar to today's. The diversity increase was neither global nor instantaneous; it happened at different times in different places. The interplay of many geological and ecological factors likely produced the diversification. Consequently, there is unlikely to be a simple or straightforward explanation for the whole event.

== Duration ==
According to a comprehensive study of biodiversity throughout the Palaeozoic, GOBE began 497.05 Ma and ended 467.33 Ma, lasting for 29.72 Myr. GOBE did not constitute one single event, as different clades diversified during different time intervals of the Late Cambrian and Early and Middle Ordovician. During the late Ordovician, diversification slowed down thanks to increased endemism and interbasinal dispersal, bringing an end to GOBE.

== Causes ==
Possible causes include an increase in marine oxygen content, changes in palaeogeography or tectonic activity, a modified nutrient supply, or global cooling.

=== Tectonic activity ===
The dispersed positions of the continents, high level of tectonic/volcanic activity, warm climate, and high CO_{2} levels would have created a large, nutrient-rich ecospace, favoring diversification. There seems to be an association between orogeny and the evolutionary radiation, with the Taconic orogeny in particular being singled out as a driver of the GOBE by enabling greater erosion of nutrients such as iron and phosphorus and their delivery to the oceans around Laurentia. In addition, the changing geography led to a more diverse landscape, with more different and isolated environments; this no doubt facilitated the emergence of bioprovinciality, and speciation by isolation of populations. The widespread reef development on the Baltican shelf in particular is attributable to the landmass's northward drift into more oligotrophic waters, enabling diversification of its reef biota. Widespread volcanism and its delivery of biologically important trace metals has similarly been proposed as a GOBE trigger, albeit controversially.

=== Global cooling ===
On the other hand, global cooling has also been offered as a cause of the radiation, with long-term biodiversity trends showing a positive correlation between cooling and biodiversity during GOBE. An uptick in fossil diversity correlates with the increasing abundance of cool-water carbonates over the course of this time interval. A transient high magnitude shift towards more positive carbon isotope ratios during the Floian may reflect the initiation of a cooling through organic carbon burial that has been proposed to have kickstarted GOBE. In the longer term as well, increasing carbon isotope ratios track biodiversity increase, further pointing to a link between cooling and GOBE. The cooling during the Middle and early Late Ordovician in particular is known for its associated burst of biodiversification. The volcanic activity that created the Flat Landing Brook Formation in New Brunswick, Canada, may have caused rapid climatic cooling and biodiversification.

=== Oxygenation ===
Thallium isotope shifts show an expansion of oxic waters throughout deep water and shallow shelf environments during the latest Cambrian and earliest Ordovician coeval with increasing burrowing depth and complexity observed among ichnofossils and increasing morphological complexity among body fossils. Thus, heightened oxygen availability may have been a key trigger for GOBE. Furthermore, Ordovician biodiversification pulses were closely linked to terminations of positive carbon isotope excursions, which are characteristic of anoxia, suggesting that diversification occurred in concert with increasing oxygen content. After the Steptoean positive carbon isotope excursion about 500 million years ago, the extinction in the ocean would have opened up new niches for photosynthetic plankton, who would absorb CO_{2} from the atmosphere and release large amount of oxygen. More oxygen and a more diversified photosynthetic plankton as the bottom of the food chain, would have affected the diversity of higher marine organisms and their ecosystems.

In the Middle to Late Ordovician, after GOBE, an expansion of anoxic waters occurred in sync with a ~50% decline in benthic invertebrates in various epicontinental seas, providing further indirect support for a coupling of seawater oxygenation with Ordovician biodiversity.

=== Extraterrestrial impacts ===
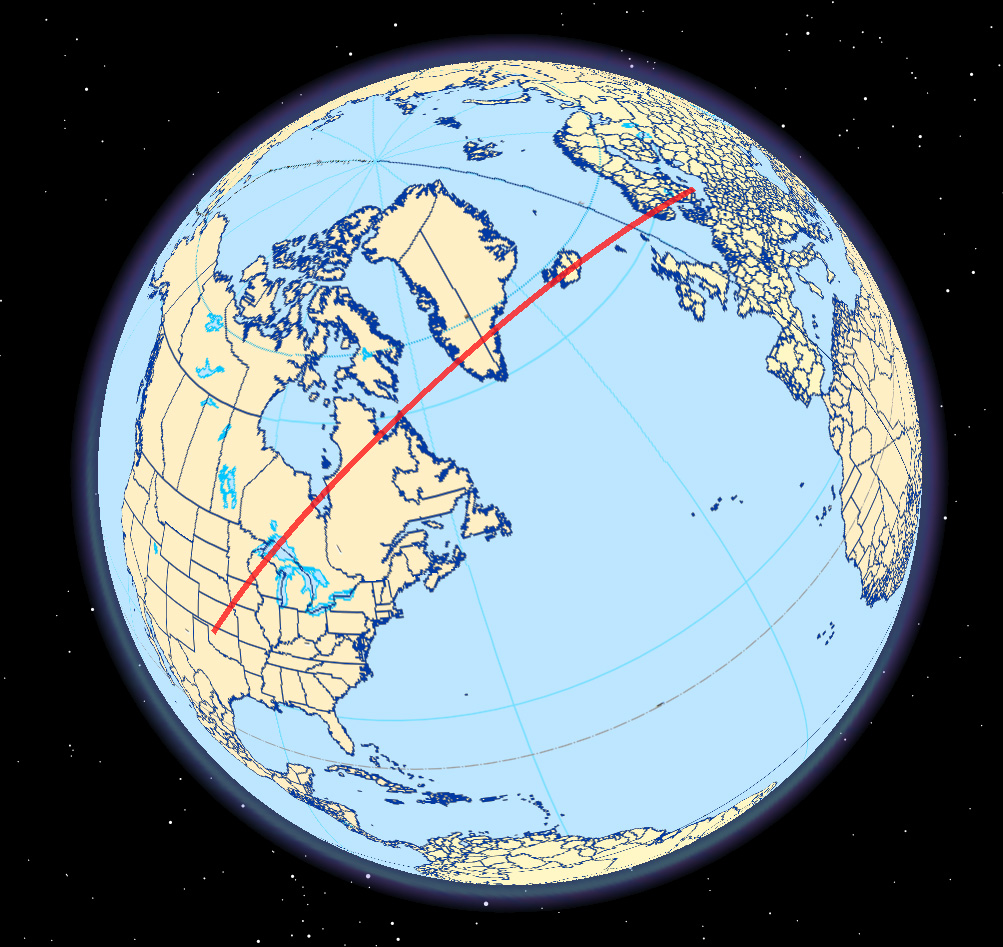
Possible line of meteors (on the modern globe) associated with the Middle Ordovician meteor event 467.5±0.28 million years ago. Although this is suggestive of a single large meteorite shower, the exact alignment of continental plates 470 million years ago is unknown and the exact timing of meteors is also unknown.

Another alternative is that the breakup of an asteroid led to the Earth being consistently pummelled by meteorites, although the proposed Ordovician meteor event happened at 467.5±0.28 million years ago. Another effect of a collision between two asteroids, possibly beyond the orbit of Mars, is a reduction in sunlight reaching the Earth's surface due to the vast dust clouds created. Evidence for this geological event comes from the relative abundance of the isotope helium-3, found in ocean sediments laid down at the time of the biodiversification event. The most likely cause of the production of high levels of helium-3 is the bombardment of lithium by cosmic rays, something which could only have happened to material which travelled through space.

However, rather than sparking evolutionary diversification, other lines of evidence point to the Ordovician meteor event instead postdating the Darriwilian biodiversity burst by about 600 kyr and the start of glaciation by 800 kyr. Instead of facilitating the radiation, the meteor event may have antagonistically acted to temporarily retard and halt biological diversification according to this thesis.

=== Positive feedbacks ===
The above triggers would have been amplified by ecological escalation, whereby any new species would co-evolve with others, creating new niches through niche partitioning, trophic layering, or by providing a new habitat. As with the Cambrian Explosion, it is likely that environmental changes drove the diversification of plankton, which permitted an increase in diversity and abundance of plankton-feeding lifeforms, including suspension feeders on the sea floor, and nektonic organisms in the water column.

== Effects ==
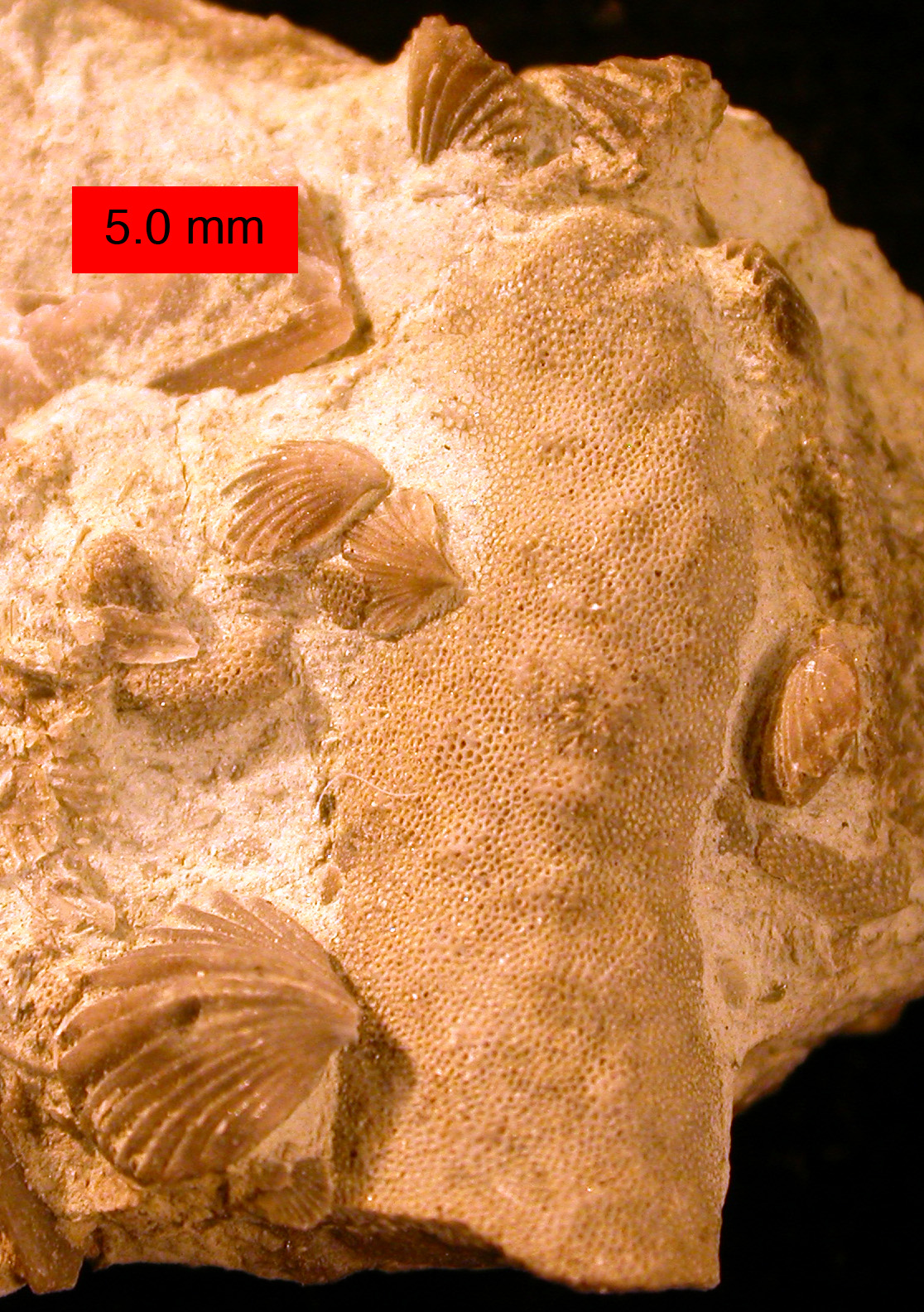
Atrypid brachiopods (Zygospira modesta) preserved in their original positions on a trepostome bryozoan; Cincinnatian (Upper Ordovician) of southeastern Indiana.

If the Cambrian Explosion is thought of as "producing" the modern phyla, the GOBE can be considered as the "filling out" of these phyla with the modern (and many extinct) classes and lower-level taxa. The GOBE is considered to be one of the most potent speciation events of the Phanerozoic era, increasing global diversity severalfold and leading to the establishment of the Palaeozoic evolutionary fauna. Notable taxonomic diversity explosions during this period include that of articulated brachiopods, gastropods, and bivalves. The acritarch record (the majority of acritarchs were probably marine algae) displays the Ordovician radiation beautifully; both diversity and disparity peaked in the middle Ordovician. The warm waters and high sea level (which had been rising steadily since the early Cambrian) permitted large numbers of phytoplankton to prosper; the accompanying diversification of the phytoplankton may have caused an accompanying radiation of zooplankton and suspension feeders.

Taxonomic diversity increased manifold; the total number of marine orders doubled, and families tripled. Marine biodiversity reached levels comparable to those of the present day. Beta diversity was the most important component of biodiversity increase from the Furongian to the Tremadocian. From the Floian onward, alpha diversity dethroned beta diversity as the greater contributor to regional diversity patterns. In addition to a diversification, the event also marked an increase in the complexity of both organisms and food webs. The number of different life modes among hard-bodied organisms doubled. Taxa began to exhibit greater provincialism and have more localized ranges, with different faunas at different parts of the globe. Communities in reefs and deeper water began to take on a character of their own, becoming more clearly distinct from other marine ecosystems. Benthic environments drastically increase in the amount and variety of bioturbation. The planktonic realm was invaded as never before, with several invertebrate lineages colonising the open waters and initiating new food chains at the end of the Cambrian into the early Ordovician. Among the newcomers colonising the planktonic realm were trilobites and cephalopods. Estuarine environments also experienced increased colonisation by living organisms. And as ecosystems became more diverse, with more species being squeezed into the food web, a more complex tangle of ecological interactions resulted, promoting strategies such as ecological tiering. The global fauna that emerged during the GOBE went on to be remarkably stable until the catastrophic end-Permian extinction and the ensuing Mesozoic Marine Revolution.

== Relationship to the Cambrian Explosion ==
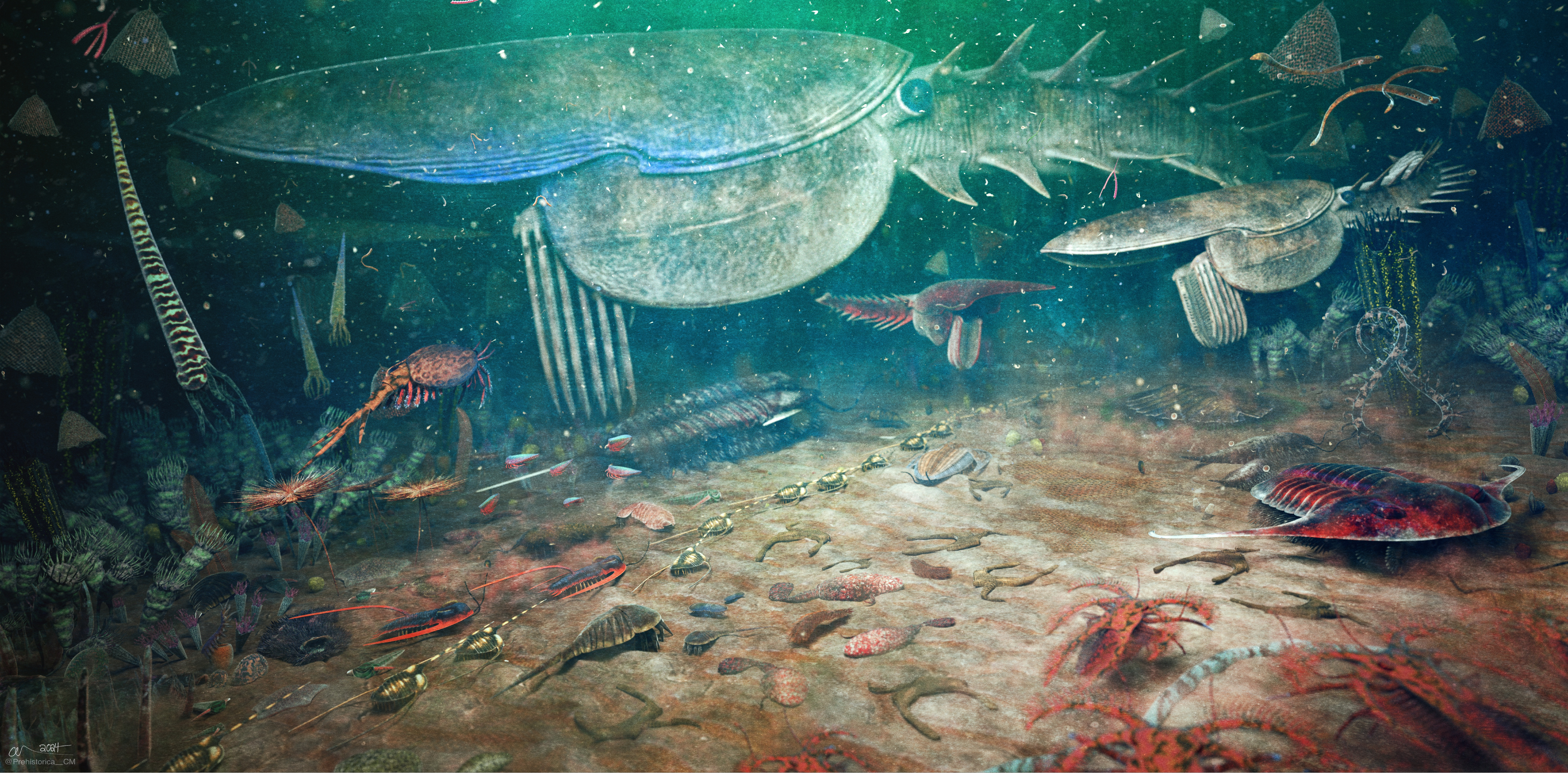
Reconstruction of the Fezouata Biota, featuring roughly 50 different species. The largest animal, Aegirocassis benmoulai (just over 2 metres — 6.6 feet — in length), is depicted in a pair swimming just above the seafloor. This giant radiodont is one of the earliest "giant" filter feeders, with frontal appendages bearing baleen-like spines. These adaptations were likely influenced by the proliferation of plankton in the early Ordovician.

Recent work has suggested that the Cambrian Explosion and GOBE, rather than being two distinct events, represented one continual evolutionary radiation of marine life occurring over the entire Early Palaeozoic. An analysis of the Paleobiology Database (PBDB) and Geobiodiversity Database (GBDB) found no statistical basis for separating the two radiations into discrete events.

A proposed biodiversity gap known as the Furongian Gap is thought by some researchers to have existed between the Cambrian Explosion and GOBE existed during the Furongian epoch, the final epoch of the Cambrian. However, whether this gap is real or an artefact of an incomplete fossil record is controversial. Analysis of the Guole Konservat–Lagerstätte and other sites in South China suggests the Furongian Gap did not exist, instead portraying this interval as one of rapid biotic turnovers.

== See also ==
- Avalon explosion
- Cambrian explosion
- Carboniferous-Earliest Permian Biodiversification Event
- Mesozoic–Cenozoic radiation
- Mesozoic marine revolution
- Evolutionary fauna
