= Paracapsulapagurus =

Paracapsulapagurus Temporal range: Maastrichtian

Scientific classification
- Kingdom: Animalia
- Phylum: Arthropoda
- Clade: Pancrustacea
- Class: Malacostraca
- Order: Decapoda
- Suborder: Pleocyemata
- Infraorder: Anomura
- Family: Paguridae
- Genus: †Paracapsulapagurus; Hyžný, Fraaije, Martin, Perrier & Sarr, 2016
- Species: †P. poponguinensis

Binomial name
- †Paracapsulapagurus poponguinensis Hyžný, Fraaije, Martin, Perrier & Sarr, 2016

Extinct genus of hermit crab

Paracapsulapagurus is an extinct monotypic genus of pagurid hermit crab from the Middle to Upper Maastrichtian in what is now Senegal.

== Etymology ==
The generic name comes from the Greek word παρά (pará, meaning "next to, near") and Capsulapagurus, signifying the genus's close relationship with the respective pagurid Capsulapagurus. The specific name comes from the type locality of Popenguine.
