= Pylopaguropsis =

Scientific classification
- Domain: Eukaryota
- Kingdom: Animalia
- Phylum: Arthropoda
- Class: Malacostraca
- Order: Decapoda
- Suborder: Pleocyemata
- Infraorder: Anomura
- Family: Paguridae
- Genus: Pylopaguropsis; Alcock, 1905

Genus of crustaceans

Pylopaguropsis is a genus of hermit crabs containing the following species:

- Pylopaguropsis atlantica Wass, 1963
- Pylopaguropsis bellula Osawa & Okuno, 2006
- Pylopaguropsis fimbriata McLaughlin & Haig, 1989
- Pylopaguropsis furusei Asakura, 2000
- Pylopaguropsis garciai McLaughlin & Haig, 1989
- Pylopaguropsis granulata Asakura, 2000
- Pylopaguropsis keijii McLaughlin & Haig, 1989
- Pylopaguropsis laevispinosa McLaughlin & Haig, 1989
- Pylopaguropsis lemaitrei Asakura & Paulay, 2003
- Pylopaguropsis lewinsohni McLaughlin & Haig, 1989
- Pylopaguropsis magnimanus Henderson, 1896
- Pylopaguropsis mollymullerae Lemaitre, 2017
- Pylopaguropsis pustulosa McLaughlin & Haig, 1989
- Pylopaguropsis pygmaeus Rahayu & Komai, 2013
- Pylopaguropsis rahayuae Asakura, 2010
- Pylopaguropsis similis Rahayu & Komai, 2013
- Pylopaguropsis speciosa McLaughlin & Haig, 1989
- Pylopaguropsis teevana Boone, 1932
- Pylopaguropsis vicina Komai & Osawa, 2004
- Pylopaguropsis zebra Henderson, 1893
