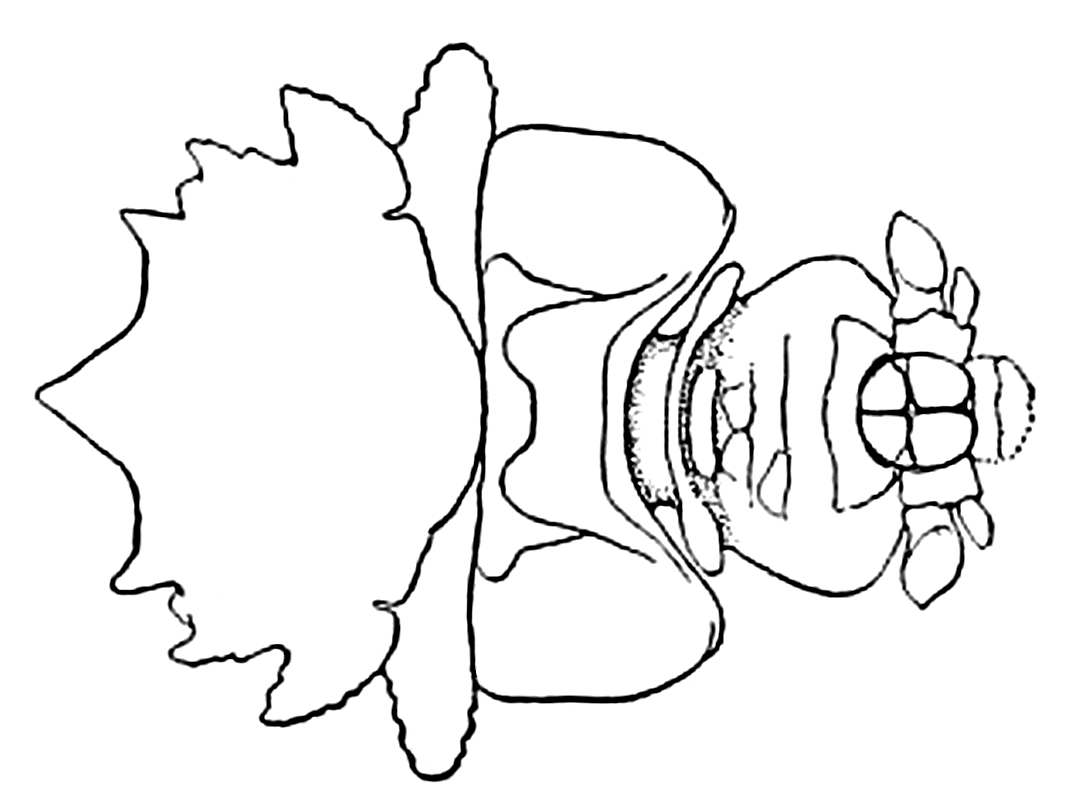
- Outline dorsal view of the body of Porcellanopagurus sp.

Scientific classification
- Domain: Eukaryota
- Kingdom: Animalia
- Phylum: Arthropoda
- Class: Malacostraca
- Order: Decapoda
- Suborder: Pleocyemata
- Infraorder: Anomura
- Family: Paguridae
- Genus: Porcellanopagurus; Filhol, 1885

Type species
- Porcellanopagurus edwardsi Filhol, 1885

= Porcellanopagurus =

Genus of crustaceans

Porcellanopagurus is a genus of hermit crabs. The genus occurs in the Pacific and Indian Oceans.

== Description ==
Porcellanopagurus is unusual among hermit crabs in that the body is largely symmetrical, with the abdomen held recurved above the cephalothorax. L. A. Borradaile interpreted Porcellanopagurus as being an independent instance of carcinisation among the Anomura.

== Species ==
Porcellanopagurus contains the following species:

- Porcellanopagurus adelocercus McLaughlin & Hogarth, 1998
- Porcellanopagurus belauensis Suzuki & Takeda, 1987
- Porcellanopagurus chiltoni de Saint Laurent & McLaughlin, 2000
- Porcellanopagurus edwardsi Filhol, 1885
- Porcellanopagurus eldredgei Kropp, 2014
- Porcellanopagurus filholi de Saint Laurent & McLaughlin, 2000
- Porcellanopagurus foresti Zarenkov, 1990
- Porcellanopagurus haptodactylus McLaughlin, 2000
- Porcellanopagurus jacquesi McLaughlin, 1997
- Porcellanopagurus japonicus Balss, 1913
- Porcellanopagurus nihonkaiensis Takeda, 1985
- Porcellanopagurus platei Lenz, 1902
- Porcellanopagurus tridentatus Whitelegge, 1900
- Porcellanopagurus truncatifrons Takeda, 1981
