= Cretaceous crab revolution =

Evolutionary diversification event during the Cretaceous period

The Cretaceous crab revolution was a major diversification event of brachyuran crustaceans (also known as true crabs) that took place during the Cretaceous period, from 145 to 66 million years ago. Nearly 80% of modern groups of crabs originated during this event. The Cretaceous crab revolution is a smaller component of the greater Mesozoic marine revolution.

== Early diversification ==
The oldest known true crabs are Eoprosopon klugi and Eocarcinus praecursor from the Early to Middle Jurassic. While that fossil crab, and a few other Jurassic species, establish that crabs existed in older time periods, crabs did not truly diversify into numerous species until the beginning of the Cretaceous. During this time, crabs evolved into many different body plans and lifestyles, including the carcinized body shape like that of blue crabs that many people are familiar with. At the same time, many families of crabs evolved away from the carcinized body plan, termed decarcinization. The Cretaceous crab revolution also witnessed the evolution of more unusual body forms in crabs, including the enigmatic Callichimaera perplexa. This rapid diversification allowed true crabs to inhabit many different environments including fresh water environments, coral reefs, swimming within the water column, and many others. Cretaceous crabs exhibit expert shell-breaking behavior with powerful dimorphic claws, with the right being larger than the left.

== See also ==
- Carcinisation
