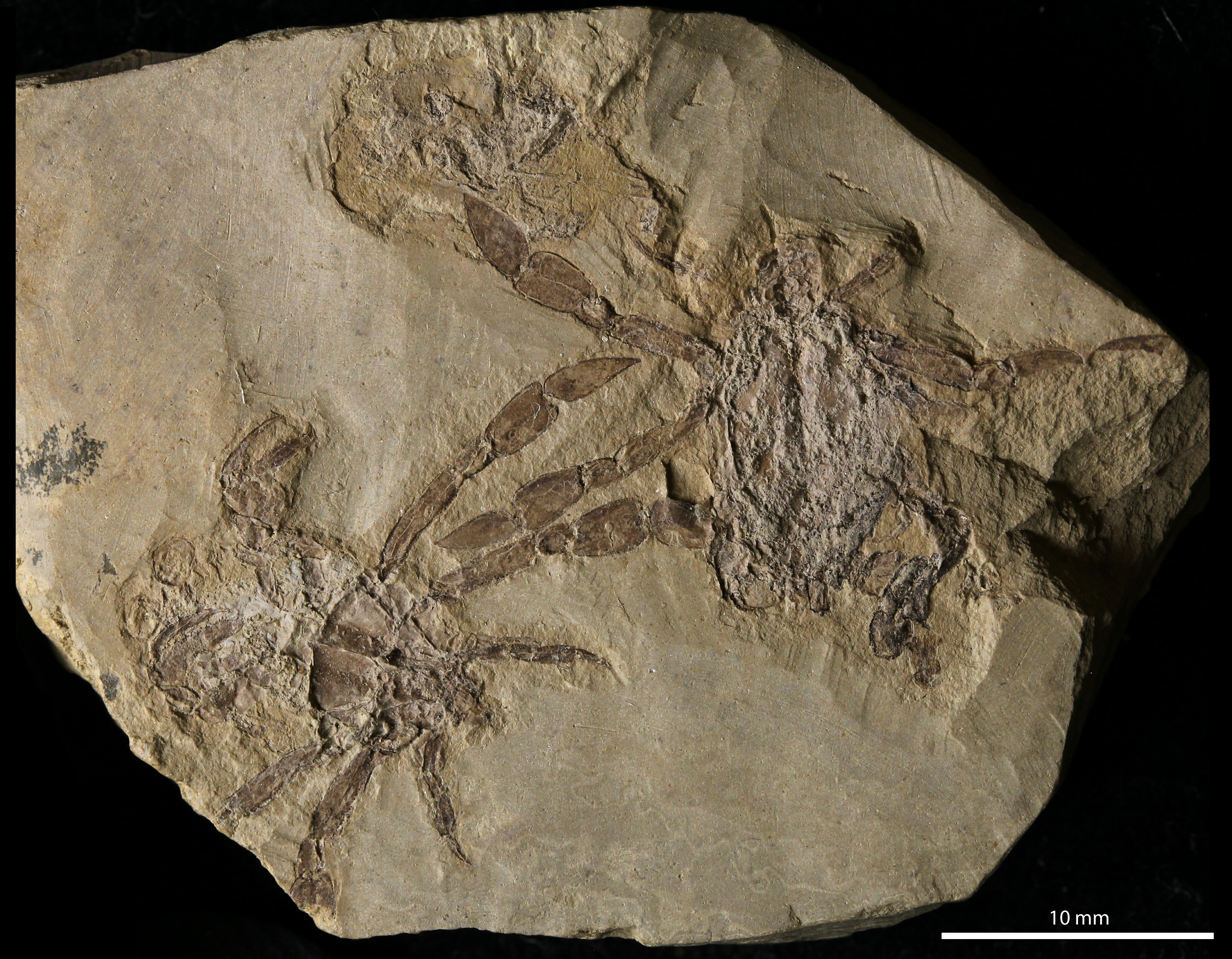
- Paratype specimen (MUN-STRI 27044-02)
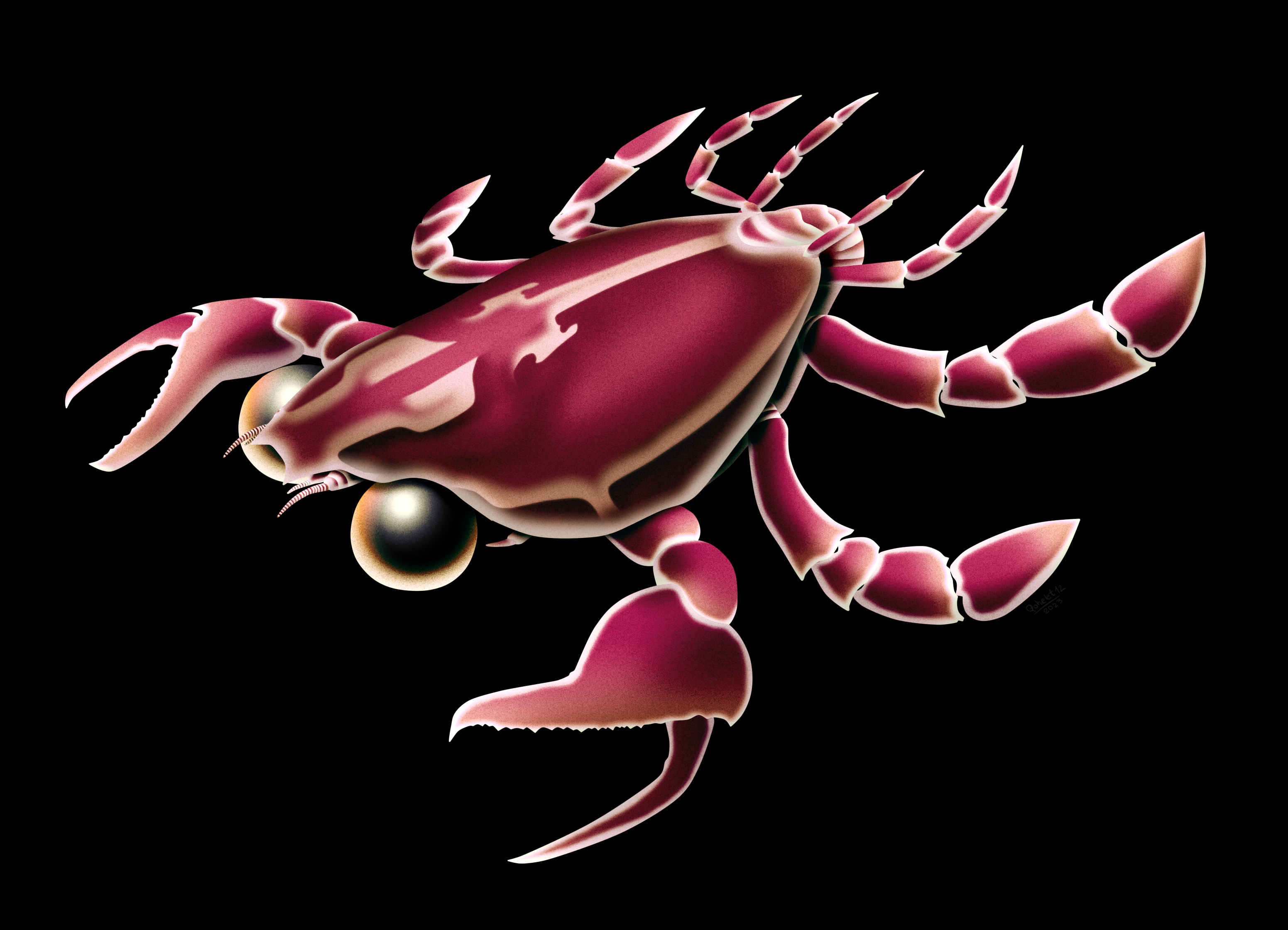
- Life restoration of C. perplexa

Scientific classification
- Kingdom: Animalia
- Phylum: Arthropoda
- Clade: Pancrustacea
- Class: Malacostraca
- Order: Decapoda
- Suborder: Pleocyemata
- Infraorder: Brachyura
- Superfamily: †Callichimaeroidea; Luque et al., 2019
- Family: †Callichimaeridae; Luque et al., 2019
- Genus: †Callichimaera; Luque et al., 2019
- Species: †C. perplexa

Binomial name
- †Callichimaera perplexa Luque et al., 2019

Synonyms
- Archaeochimaera macrophthalma Luque, 2012 (nomen nudum)

= Callichimaera =

Callichimaera Temporal range: Middle Cretaceous, 95–90 Ma

Extinct genus of crabs

Callichimaera perplexa is a species of small crabs known from the Cretaceous Churuvita Group of Colombia and the Frontier Formation of the United States. Because it possesses a strange combination of anatomical features, it is said to be the "platypus of crabs". The presence of certain features in this species, such as its large claws and swimming limbs, confirm that those features were present in the crab lineage up to 95 million years ago. It evolved during the Cretaceous crab revolution.

== Etymology ==
The generic name Callichimaera is derived from the Ancient Greek prefix "calli-" (kalós), meaning beautiful, and "chimaera" (chímaira), meaning a composite mythological animal, a reference to the bizarre forms and characteristics of this species. The specific name is derived from the Latin "perplexus", meaning intricate (or perplexing in that manner), a reference to the complex anatomical affinities this species displays.

== Description ==
Size of two C. perplexa specimens

Callichimaera possesses features that are commonly associated with the larval crab stage called the megalopa. This includes features like large compound eyes, a small fusiform body, and thin mouth parts. However, the fossil crabs also show evidence of sexual maturity, suggesting they are adult forms. This species likely evolved those larval features via a process called heterochrony.

These crabs were small, with carapace length up to 16 mm (0.63 in), and width up to 10 mm (0.39 in).

Callichimaera does not have the typical crab-like shape, something that has occurred several times among crabs since the Cretaceous.

Because Callichimaera has large paddle-like legs, it was probably an active swimmer, opposed to predominantly living on the seafloor.

== Paleoecology ==
Ecological reconstruction of C. perplexa swimming in the sea

Callichimaera lived in a tropical environment. Fossils are rarely preserved in tropical settings in comparison to other parts of the world, making this fossil an even more unusual discovery. An in-depth study of the crab's eyes indicated that Callichimaera was an active predator living high in the water column.

Callichimaera was discovered in deposits also containing comma shrimp and caridean shrimp.
