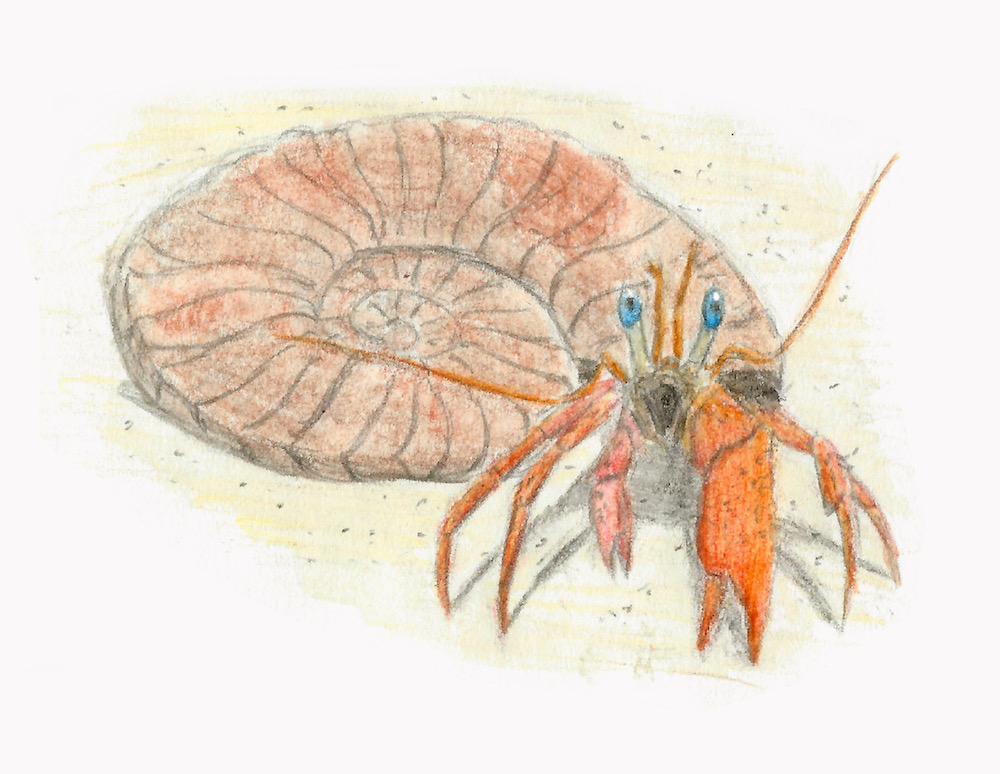
- Life restoration

Scientific classification
- Kingdom: Animalia
- Phylum: Arthropoda
- Class: Malacostraca
- Order: Decapoda
- Suborder: Pleocyemata
- Infraorder: Anomura
- Family: Paguridae
- Genus: Palaeopagurus; Van Straelen, 1925

= Palaeopagurus =

Palaeopagurus Temporal range: Lower Cretaceous

Extinct genus of crustaceans

Palaeopagurus is an extinct genus of hermit crab from the Lower Cretaceous.

A fossil of the species P. vandenengeli is notable for having been preserved in situ in the shell of an ammonite. Along with a lack of fossils of hermit crabs in gastropod shells from before the Late Cretaceous, this suggests that ammonite shells may have played a more important role in the early evolution of hermit crabs' characteristic shell-dwelling habits. It contains the following species:

- †Palaeopagurus acutus Crônier & Courville, 2004
- †Palaeopagurus couloni (de Tribolet, 1874)
- †Palaeopagurus cretaceous Mertin, 1941
- †Palaeopagurus deslongchampsi Van Straelen, 1924 (type species)
- †Palaeopagurus guilleaumei Van Straelen, 1924
- †Palaeopagurus jurensis (Étallon, 1861)
- †Palaeopagurus kellowiensis (Étallon, 1861)
- †Palaeopagurus laevis Van Straelen, 1924
- †Palaeopagurus morinicus (Sauvage, 1891)
- †Palaeopagurus neraudeaui Crônier & Courville, 2004
- †Palaeopagurus pilsbryi Roberts, 1962
- †Palaeopagurus quadratus Van Straelen, 1924
- †Palaeopagurus rumignyensis Fischer, 1969
- †Palaeopagurus schneidi Kuhn, 1936
- †Palaeopagurus serialis (Carter, 1886)
- †Palaeopagurus spinosus Van Straelen, 1924
- †Palaeopagurus tuberculatus Van Straelen, 1924
- †Palaeopagurus vandenengeli Fraaije, 2003
- †Palaeopagurus würgauensis Kuhn, 1936
