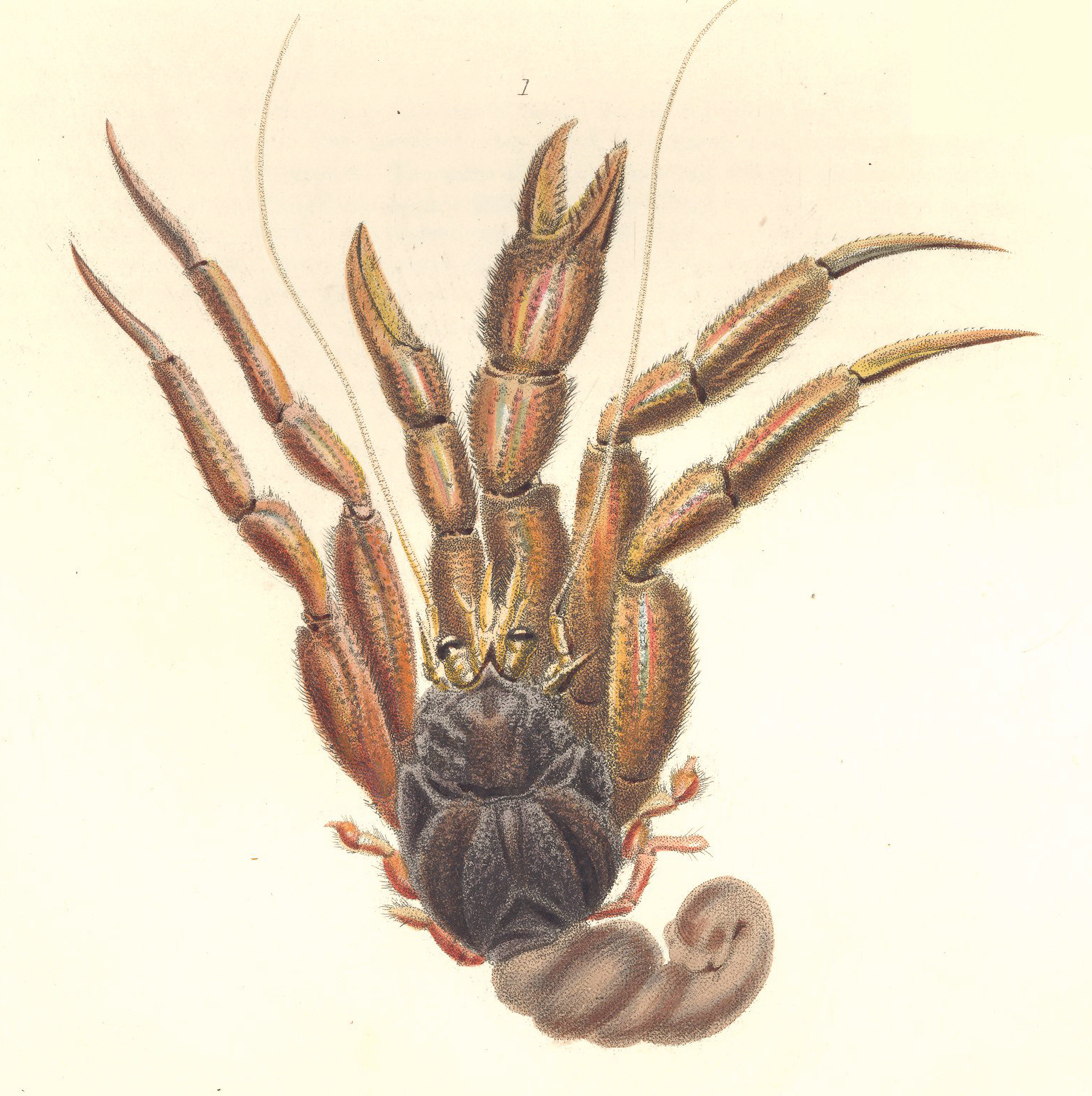
- Labidochirus splendescens

Scientific classification
- Kingdom: Animalia
- Phylum: Arthropoda
- Class: Malacostraca
- Order: Decapoda
- Suborder: Pleocyemata
- Infraorder: Anomura
- Family: Paguridae
- Genus: Labidochirus; Benedict, 1892

= Labidochirus =

Genus of crustaceans

Labidochirus is a genus of hermit crabs in the family Paguridae. They occur in the North Pacific and Arctic Oceans.

== Species ==
There are two recognized species:

- Labidochirus anomalus (Balss, 1913)
- Labidochirus splendescens (Owen, 1839) – splendid hermit crab
