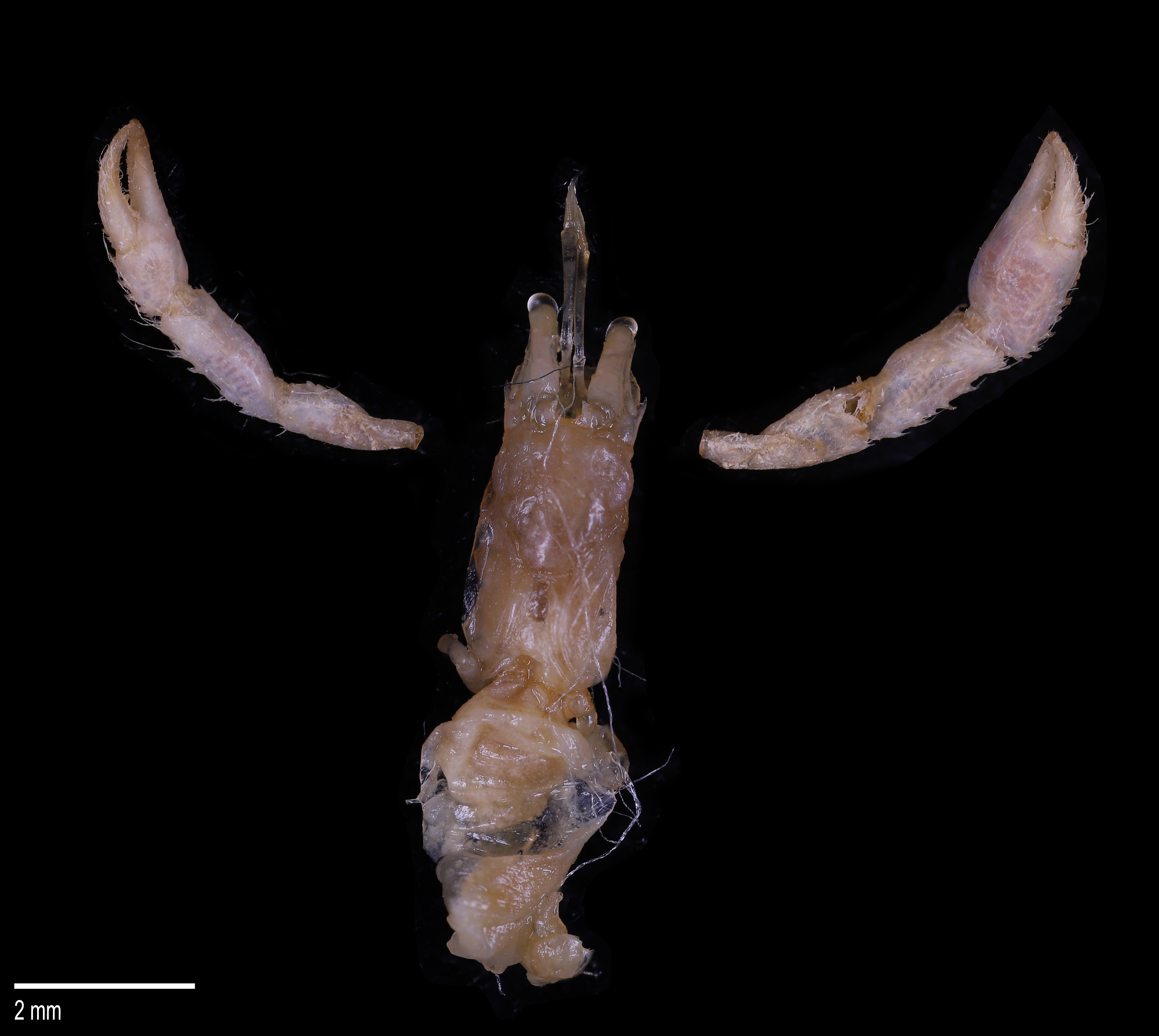
- Decaphyllus similis specimen, taken by Mélanie Van Weddingen

Scientific classification
- Kingdom: Animalia
- Phylum: Arthropoda
- Clade: Pancrustacea
- Class: Malacostraca
- Order: Decapoda
- Suborder: Pleocyemata
- Infraorder: Anomura
- Family: Paguridae
- Genus: Decaphyllus de Saint Laurent, 1968

Type species
- Decaphyllus spinicornis de Saint Laurent, 1968

= Decaphyllus =

Genus of crustaceans

Decaphyllus is a genus of small hermit crabs in the family Paguridae, found in the Indo-Pacific region. The genus was erected by Michèle de Saint Laurent in 1968, with Decaphyllus spinicornis as its type species. It is generally regarded as closely related to Catapaguroides and is distinguished by a characteristic combination of morphological features, including the structure of the ambulatory legs, fourth pereopods and telson. The genus originally comprised three species, but later revisions expanded it to eleven recognised species.

== Taxonomy ==
Decaphyllus is a genus of hermit crabs erected by de Saint Laurent in 1968, with Decaphyllus spinicornis as the type species.

In the original treatment, Decaphyllus was established for three Indo-Pacific species and was regarded as closely related to Catapaguroides. Patsy Ann McLaughlin later emended the generic diagnosis and added two Indonesian species, Decaphyllus barunajaya and Decaphyllus maci. In 2013, Komai and Rahayu described a further six species, bringing the total number of recognised species to eleven.

In her discussion of Decaphyllus barunajaya, McLaughlin noted that reduction or absence of the arthrobranchs on the third maxilliped was not sufficient to justify separating that species generically, because it shared with other members of Decaphyllus a broad suite of characters, including the rounded rostrum, reduced crista dentata without an accessory tooth, absence of the pleurobranch above the fourth pereopod, specialised fourth pereopods, the arrangement of the sexual tubes, a single female left gonopore, and the characteristic telson shape and armature.

== Morphology ==
=== General characters ===
Species of Decaphyllus are small pagurid hermit crabs. In McLaughlin's emended diagnosis, the genus is characterised by eight to ten pairs of phyllobranchiate gills, with the pleurobranch above the fourth pereopod absent. The shield is well calcified or partly decalcified medially, with strongly convex lateral margins, while the posterior carapace is weakly calcified or membranous. The crista dentata of the third maxilliped is reduced and lacks an accessory tooth.

=== Diagnostic features ===
The genus is distinguished from Catapaguroides by the unarmed but setose dactyli of the ambulatory legs, the non-chelate fourth pereopods, and the form of the telson. In Decaphyllus, the dactylus of the fourth pereopod bears dense setae that obscure the terminal claw. McLaughlin also noted that the fourth pereopods are simple rather than semichelate, and that the sternite of the fifth pereopods is entire, not divided into two lobes by a median groove. The telson lacks a transverse suture and usually has strongly asymmetrical posterior lobes armed with two to four spines.

=== Cephalic appendages and chelipeds ===
Additional characters noted in later revisions include dorsal or dorsomesial rows of long setal tufts on the ocular peduncles, the absence of long dorsolateral plumose setae on the ultimate segment of the antennular peduncle, and spiniform armature or protuberances on the meri and ischia of the chelipeds. The right cheliped is generally slightly longer and stouter than the left, although both are similar in overall form.

=== Sexual morphology ===
In males, the right sexual tube is very long, directed from right to left beneath the thorax and recurved anteriorly, while the left sexual tube is shorter and directed in the opposite direction. Females have a single gonopore on the left side. Males possess unpaired pleopods on abdominal somites 2 to 5, which are uniramous or very unequally biramous, whereas females bear four unpaired pleopods.

=== Interspecific variation ===
Variation occurs within the genus in the development of the arthrobranchs of the third maxilliped. McLaughlin noted that these may be small, vestigial, or absent, and revised the diagnosis of the genus accordingly. Later authors likewise concluded that this character is too variable to define the genus on its own, and must be considered together with other morphological features.

== Species ==
The genus contains the following species:

- Decaphyllus barunajaya McLaughlin, 1997.
- Decaphyllus brevis Komai & Rahayu, 2013.
- Decaphyllus deliquus Komai & Rahayu, 2013.
- Decaphyllus janquai de Saint Laurent, 1968.
- Decaphyllus litoralis Komai & Rahayu, 2013.
- Decaphyllus maci McLaughlin, 1997.
- Decaphyllus proprius Komai & Rahayu, 2013.
- Decaphyllus similis de Saint Laurent, 1968.
- Decaphyllus spinicornis de Saint Laurent, 1968.
- Decaphyllus spinulodigitus Komai & Rahayu, 2013.
- Decaphyllus tenuis Komai & Rahayu, 2013.

The original species included in Decaphyllus were Decaphyllus spinicornis, the type species from Japan, Decaphyllus similis from Indonesia, and Decaphyllus janquai from New Guinea and Indonesia.

== Distribution ==
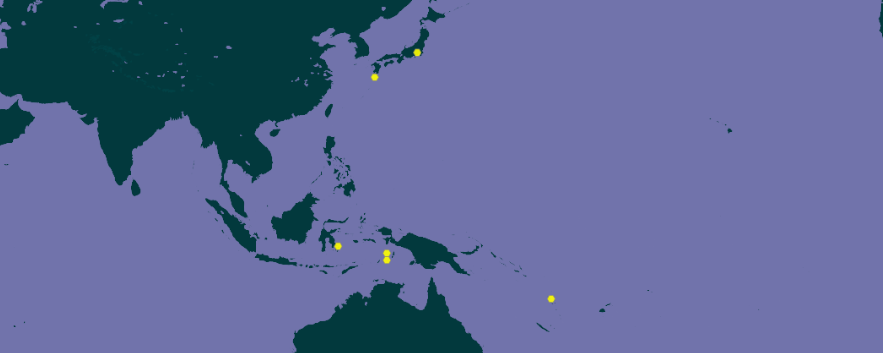
Decaphyllus distribution map from GBIF (accessed 7 April 2025)

According to the Global Biodiversity Information Facility (GBIF), there have been 14 known occurrences of Decaphyllus between 1906 and 2006. These records are distributed in the Indo-Pacific region, particularly around Japan, Indonesia and New Guinea.

== Ecology and habitat ==
The species of Decaphyllus are marine benthic hermit crabs that lives from shallow coral-reef habitats to deeper sublittoral bottoms. Most species are known from depths greater than 50 m, but Decaphyllus litoralis is unusual in inhabiting shallow coral reefs at depths of 4–18 m in the Ryukyu Islands and the Bohol Sea.

Collection records indicate that species occupy a range of substrates, including muddy sand, coarse sand, sponge-rich bottoms, reef slopes, and oyster beds, and have been recorded from approximately 4 m to more than 500 m depth. Some species have been collected from gastropod or scaphopod shells, consistent with the shell-dwelling habits typical of hermit crabs.

The genus was first recorded from the Philippines in the 2013 revision by Komai and Rahayu. No detailed behavioural synthesis for Decaphyllus has yet been published, and most ecological information comes from collection data associated with taxonomic studies.
