= Mesozoic–Cenozoic radiation =

Increase in biodiversity since the Permian extinction

This image shows the biodiversity during the Phanerozoic. Note the marked increase in biodiversity after the Permian extinction

The fragmentation of Pangea resulted in allopatric speciation and an increase in overall biodiversity.

The Mesozoic–Cenozoic Radiation is the third major extended increase of biodiversity in the Phanerozoic, after the Cambrian Explosion and the Great Ordovician Biodiversification Event, which appeared to have exceeded the equilibrium reached after the Ordovician radiation. Made known by its identification in marine invertebrates, this evolutionary radiation began in the Mesozoic, after the Permian extinctions, and continues to this date. This spectacular radiation affected both terrestrial and marine flora and fauna, during which the "modern" fauna came to replace much of the Paleozoic fauna. Notably, this radiation event was marked by the rise of angiosperms during the mid-Cretaceous, and the K-Pg extinction, which initiated the rapid increase in mammalian biodiversity.

== Causes and significance ==
The exact causes of this extended increase in biodiversity are still being debated, however, the Mesozoic-Cenozoic radiation has often been related to large-scale paleogeographical changes. The fragmentation of the supercontinent Pangaea has been related to an increase in both marine and terrestrial biodiversity. The link between the fragmentation of supercontinents and biodiversity was first proposed by Valentine and Moores in 1972. They hypothesized that the isolation of terrestrial environments and the partitioning of oceanic water masses, as a result of the breaking up of Pangaea, resulted in an increase in allopatric speciation, which led to an increased biodiversity. These smaller landmasses, while individually being less diverse than a supercontinent, contain a high degree of endemic species, resulting in an overall higher biodiversity than a single landmass of equivalent size. It is therefore argued that, similarly to the Ordovician bio-diversification, the differentiation of biotas along environmental gradients caused by the fragmentation of a supercontinent, was a driving force behind the Mesozoic-Cenozoic radiation.

Part of the dramatic increase in biodiversity during this time was caused by the evolutionary radiation of flowering plants, or angiosperms, during the mid-Cretaceous. Characteristics of this clade associated with reproduction have served as a key innovation for an entire clade, and led to a burst of evolution known as the Cretaceous Terrestrial Revolution. These later diversified further and co-radiated with pollinating insects, increasing biodiversity.

A third factor which played a role in the Mesozoic-Cenozoic radiation was the K-Pg extinction, which marked the end of the dinosaurs and, surprisingly, resulted in a massive increase in biodiversity of terrestrial tetrapods, which can almost entirely be attributed to the radiation of mammals. There are multiple things which could have caused this deviation from the equilibrium, one of which is that the before the K-Pg extinction an equilibrium was reached which limited biodiversity. The extinction event reorganized the fundamental ecology, on which diversity is built and maintained. After these reorganized ecosystems stabilized a new, higher, equilibrium was reached, which was maintained during the Cenozoic. Cenozoic biodiversity reached a peak twice as high as the biodiversity peak during the Palaeozoic.

== Pull of the recent ==
One effect which has to be taken into account when estimating past biodiversity levels is the pull of the recent, which describes a phenomenon in the fossil record which causes biodiversity estimates to be skewed towards modern taxa. This bias towards recent taxa is caused by a better availability of more recent fossil records. In mammals it has also been argued that the complexity of teeth, allowing for precise taxonomic identification of fragmentary fossils, increases their perceived diversity when compared to other clades at the time. The contribution of this effect to the apparent increase in biodiversity is still unclear and heavily debated.

== See also ==
- Evolutionary faunas, the third of which corresponds to the Mesozoic–Cenozoic radiation
