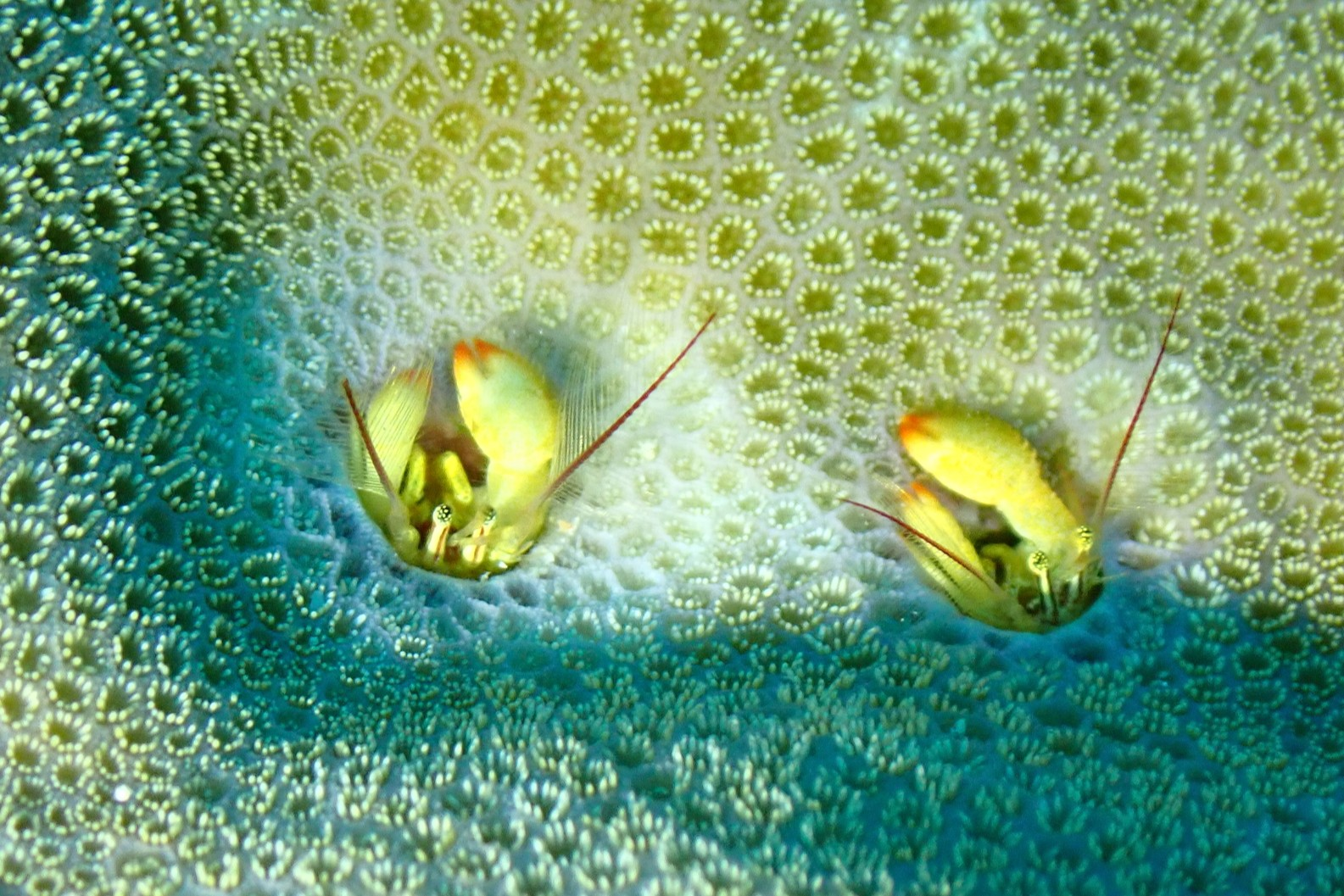

Scientific classification
- Kingdom: Animalia
- Phylum: Arthropoda
- Clade: Pancrustacea
- Class: Malacostraca
- Order: Decapoda
- Suborder: Pleocyemata
- Infraorder: Anomura
- Family: Paguridae
- Genus: Paguritta; Melin 1939

Type species
- Paguritta gracilipes Melin, 1939

Synonyms
- Eupagurus (Paguritta) Melin, 1939; Orthopaguropsis Serène, 1957

= Paguritta =

Genus of hermit crabs

Paguritta is a genus of hermit crabs in the family Paguridae, known as coral hermit crabs. Atypically for hermit crabs, this genus comprises species which live within polychaete tubes associated with corals (such as those of Spirobranchus giganteus), or bore their own holes in living coral, depending on species. They feed by filtering using their modified antennae equipped with setae and setules.

There are seven species assigned to this genus:

- Paguritta corallicola Lewinsohn, 1978
- Paguritta gracilipes Melin, 1939
- Paguritta harmsi (Gordon, 1935)
- Paguritta kroppi McLaughlin & Lemaitre, 1993
- Paguritta morgani McLaughlin & Lemaitre, 1993
- Paguritta scottae McLaughlin & Lemaitre, 1993
- Paguritta vittata Komai & Nishi, 1996

A diagnostic feature of this genus is the complete absence of pleopods in the males and their reduction in females; the former trait is shared with multiple other genera, but only the females of Anapagurus drachi experience a similar degree of pleopod reduction. Another is the symmetry of their uropods, thought to be due to their niche; hermit crabs inhabiting gastropod shells have asymmetrical uropods due to the shell's spiral. Paguritta kroppi individuals may have both male and female gonopores.
