= Mesozoic marine revolution =

Evolutionary arms race

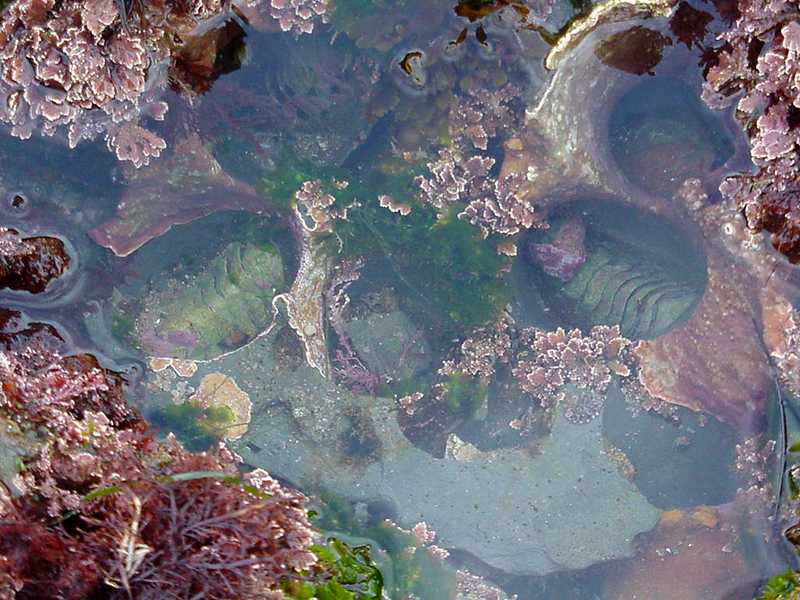
Seaweed and two chitons in a tide pool

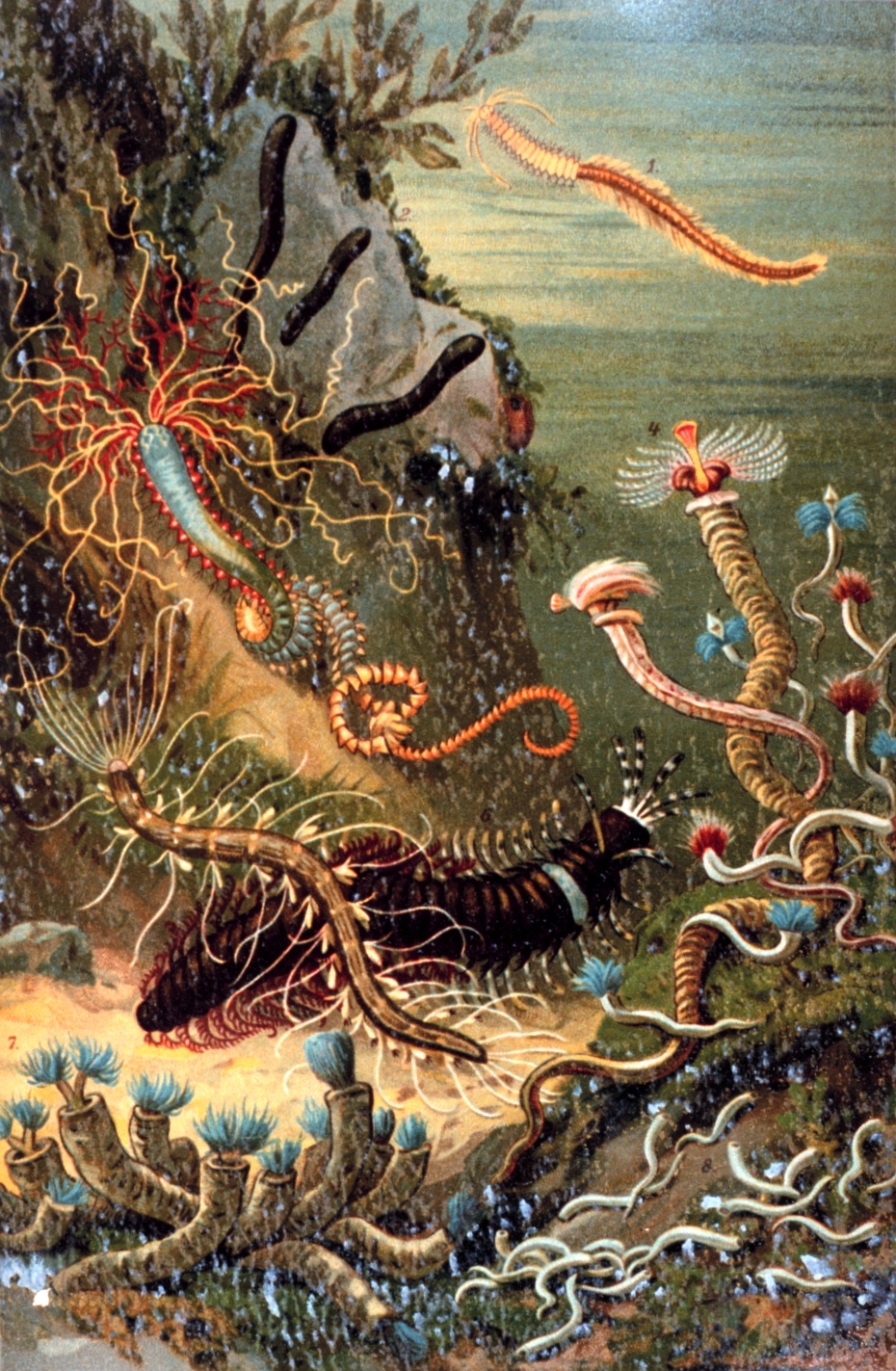
"A variety of marine worms": plate from Das Meer by M. J. Schleiden (1804–1881)

The Mesozoic marine revolution (MMR) refers to the increase in shell-crushing (durophagous) and boring predation in shallow-sea (neritic) and some deep-sea marine organisms throughout the Mesozoic era (251 Mya to 66 Mya), along with bulldozing and sediment remodelling in benthic marine habitats. The term was first coined by Geerat J. Vermeij, who based his work on that of Steven M. Stanley. While the MMR was initially restricted to the Cretaceous (145 Mya to 66 Mya), more recent studies have suggested that the beginning of this ecological succession/evolutionary arms race extends as far back as the Triassic, with the MMR now being considered to have started in the Anisian or the Aalenian. It coincided with the rise of large secondarily adapted marine reptiles such as ichthyosaurs, sauropterygians (plesiosaurs, nothosaurs, placodonts), thalattosaurs and thalattosuchians, proliferation of shell-destroying mesopredators such as teleosts, stomatopods and decapods, a trend toward benthos infaunalization, and extinction/habitat restriction of sessile organisms incapable of reattachment once dislodged.

The MMR is an important evolutionary transition from the Paleozoic fauna to the more modern-looking fauna, which occurred throughout the Mesozoic. It was, however, not the first bout of increased predatory pressure; that occurred around the end of the Ordovician. There is some evidence of adaptation to durophagy during the Paleozoic, particularly in crinoids.

== Causes ==
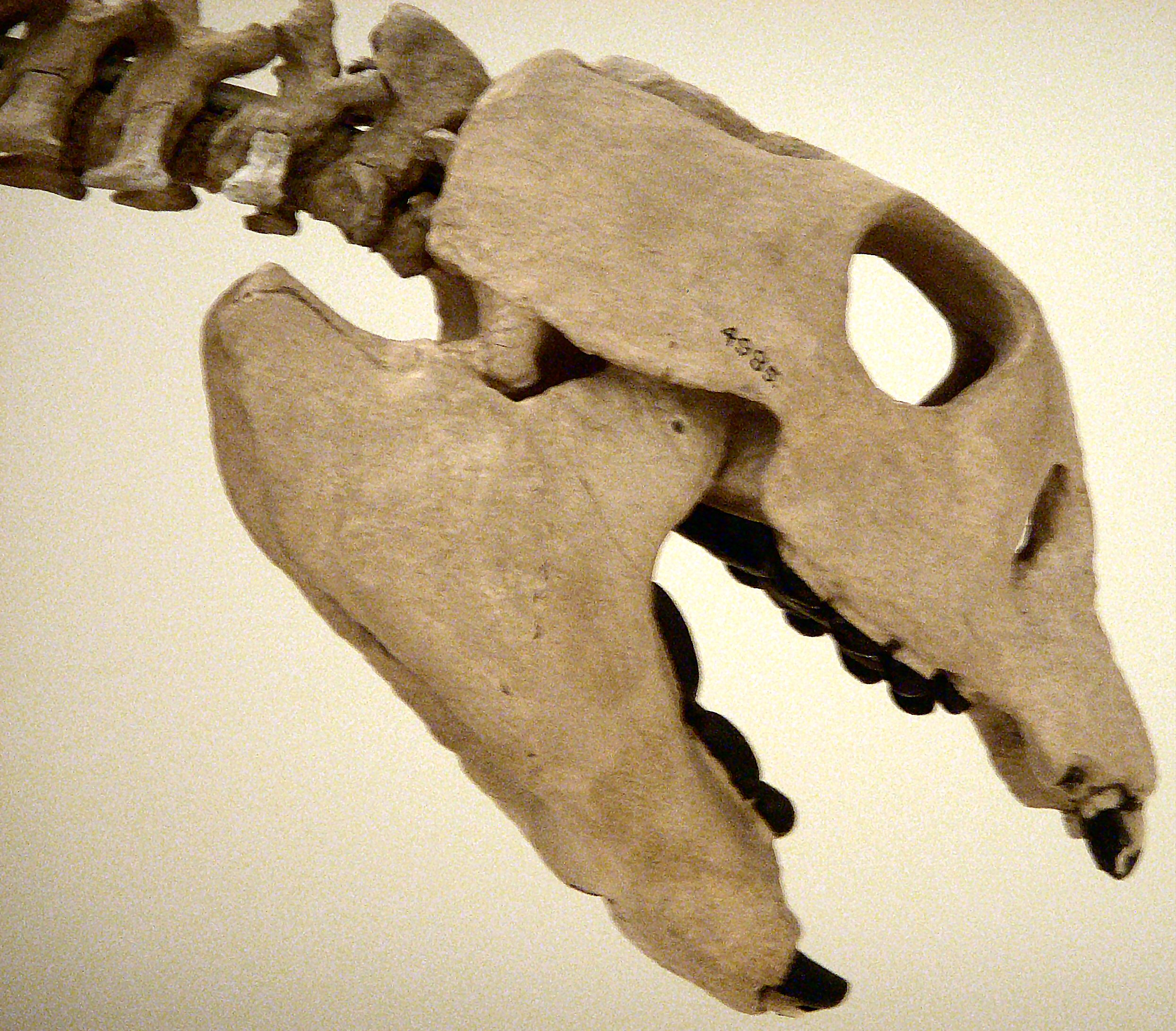
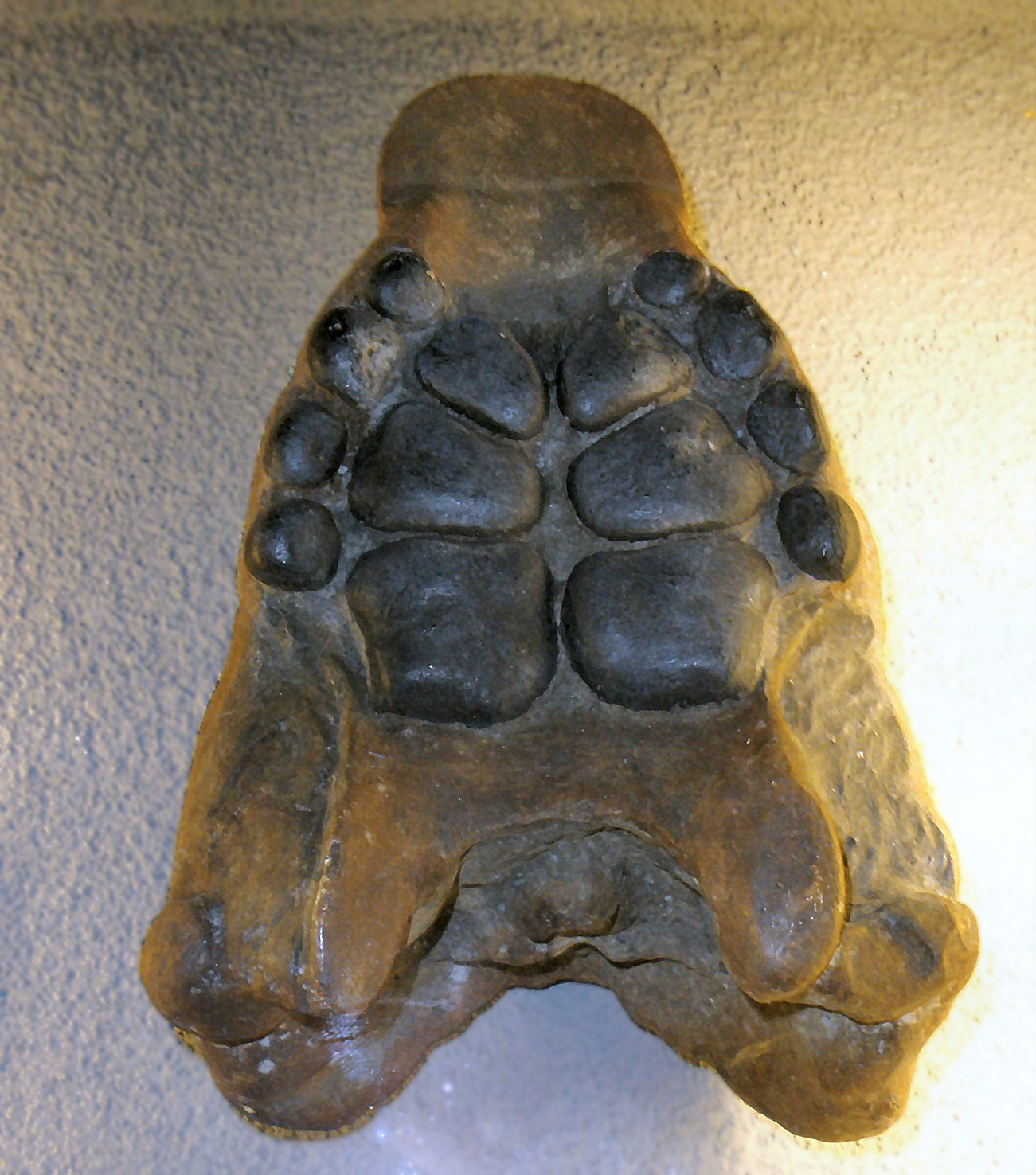
Skull and palate crushing teeth of the Middle Triassic placodont Placodus gigas

The Mesozoic marine revolution was driven by the evolution of shell-crushing behaviour among Mesozoic marine predators, particularly marine reptiles, with the technique being perfected in the Late Cretaceous. This forced shelled marine invertebrates to develop defences against such predation or face extinction. The consequences of this can be seen in many invertebrates today. Such predators are thought to include: Triassic placodonts, Triassic ichthyosaurs, Triassic omphalosaurids, Triassic plesiosaurs, Jurassic pliosaurs, Late Cretaceous mosasaurs and Cretaceous ptychodontoid sharks. Many gastropods also evolved to feed on prey with shells. However, because most durophagous predators were generalists, their effect on anti-predator shell architecture has been viewed by some as diffuse and not as extensive as other authors have suggested. Nevertheless, a separate trend of the evolution of specialist predators has been detected during the MMR amidst the background trend of evolution of generalist predators.

It is thought that the break-up of Pangaea and the formation of new oceans throughout the Mesozoic brought together previously isolated marine communities, forcing them to compete and adapt. The increased shelf space caused by sea-level rise and a hyper-greenhouse climate provided more iterations and chances to evolve, resulting in increasing biodiversity.

The explosion of angiosperms in the Cretaceous also enhanced the hydrological cycling, speeding up rates of weathering and nutrient flow into the oceans, which has been cited as a possible driver of the MMR.

Another proposal is the evolution of hermit crabs. These exploit the shells of dead gastropods, effectively doubling the life-span of the shell. This allows durophagous predators nearly twice the prey, making it a viable niche to exploit.

== Effects ==
The net result of the Mesozoic marine revolution was a change from the sedentary epifaunal lifestyle of the Palaeozoic evolutionary fauna to the infaunal/planktonic mode of life of the modern fauna. Non-mobile types that failed to re-attach to their substrate (such as brachiopods) when removed were picked off as easy prey, whereas those that could hide from predation or be mobile enough to escape had an evolutionary advantage. Per capita mean metabolic rates among marine gastropods living in shallow water increased by approximately 150% from the Late Triassic to the Late Cretaceous.

Three major trends can be associated with this:

1. Reduction in suspension feeding epifauna
2. Increasing abundance of infauna
3. An intermediate stage of mobile epifauna.

Major casualties of the Mesozoic marine revolution include: sessile crinoids, gastropods, brachiopods and epifaunal bivalves.

== Affected taxa ==
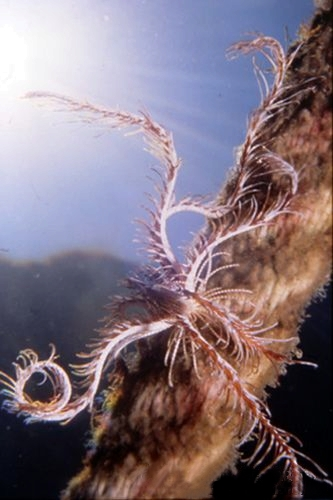
Adult comatulid crinoids, like this Antedon mediterranea specimen, only have vestigial stalks and can actively move around to avoid predation

=== Crinoids ===
The Mesozoic Marine Revolution heavily affected the crinoids, making the majority of their forms extinct. Their sessile nature made them easy prey for durophagous predators since the Triassic. Survivors (such as the comatulids) could swim or crawl, behaved nocturnally or had autotomy (the ability to shed limbs in defence).

The shift in the range of sessile stalked crinoids during the late Mesozoic from the shallow shelf to habitats further offshore suggests that they were forced by increased predation pressure in shallow water to migrate to a deep water refuge environment where predation pressure was lower and their mode of life more viable. This migration was not globally synchronous and delayed in the Southern Hemisphere; it did not occur until the Late Eocene in Australia and Antarctica, and until the Early Miocene in Zealandia.

=== Echinoids ===
Echinoids do not suffer major predation (save for general infaunalisation) during the Mesozoic Marine Revolution but it is clear from bromalites (fossilised 'vomit') that cidaroids were consumed by predators. Echinoids radiate into predatory niches and are thought to have perfected coral grazing in the Late Cretaceous. Cidaroids too may have contributed to the downfall of the crinoids. The increases in echinoid predation continued into the Cenozoic.

=== Brachiopods ===
Brachiopods, the dominant benthic organism of the Palaeozoic, suffered badly during the Mesozoic Marine Revolution. Their sessile foot-attached nature made them easy prey to durophagous predators. The fact that they could not re-attach to a substrate if an attack failed meant their chances of survival were slim. Unlike bivalves, brachiopods never adapted to an infaunal habit (excluding lingulids) and so remained vulnerable throughout the Mesozoic Marine Revolution. As a result of increased predation pressure on top of heightened competition with bivalves, brachiopods became a minor component of most marine faunas by the Cenozoic despite their incredible diversity and abundance during the Palaeozoic and early Mesozoic.

=== Bivalves ===
Bivalves adapted more readily than the brachiopods to this ecological transition. Many bivalves adopted an infaunal habit, using their siphons to gather nutrients from the sediment-water interface while remaining safe. Corbulids developed layers of conchiolin within their shells to better resist predation. Others still, like Pecten, developed the ability to jump a short distance away from predators by contracting their valves.

Like brachiopods, epifaunal varieties of bivalves were preyed upon heavily. Among epifaunal types (such as mussels and oysters), the ability to fuse to the substrate made them more difficult to consume for smaller predators. Epifaunal bivalves were preyed on heavily before the Norian but extinction rates diminish after this.

=== Gastropods ===
Benthic gastropods were heavily preyed upon throughout the Mesozoic Marine Revolution, the weaker shelled types being pushed out of the benthic zone into more isolated habitats. The Palaeozoic archaeogastropods were subsequently replaced by neritaceans, mesogastropods and neogastropods. The former typically have symmetrical, umbilicate shells that are mechanically weaker than the latter. These lack an umbilicus and also developed the ability to modify the interior of their shells, allowing them to develop sculptures on their exterior to act as defence against predators.

Another development among Muricidae was the ability to bore through shells and consume prey. These marks (while relatively rare) generally occur on sessile invertebrates, implying that they put pressure on Palaeozoic-type faunas during the Mesozoic Marine Revolution.

=== Bryozoans ===
Bryozoans exhibited no significant anti-predatory adaptations during the Jurassic, suggesting that they were during this period unaffected by the MMR.

== See also ==
- Cretaceous crab revolution
- Carboniferous-Earliest Permian Biodiversification Event
