= Diachronism =

Definition geological term

In geology, a diachronism (Greek dia, "through" + chronos, "time" + -ism), or diachronous deposit, is a sedimentary rock formation in which the material, although of a similar nature, varies in age with the place where it was deposited.

Typically this occurs as a result of a marine transgression or regression, or the progressive development of a delta. As the shoreline advances or retreats, a succession of continuous deposits representing different environments (for example beach, shallow water, deeper water) may be left behind. Although each type of deposit (facies) may be continuous over a wide area, its age varies according to the position of the shoreline through time.

An example is the sandy beds near the end of the lower Carboniferous of the west of England (the Drybrook sandstone of the Forest of Dean). Deposition of this began much later in the Bristol area than further north.

The detection of diachronous beds can be quite problematic since fossil assemblages tend to migrate geographically with their environment of formation. They are generally revealed by the presence of marker species, fossils which can be dated reliably from other beds.

== Other usages ==
The term may also be applied to other features that vary in age, such as erosion surfaces, areas of uplift, etc. It is also sometimes applied to fossils which appear sporadically at different times in different places due to migration, though such usage is regarded by some authors as incorrect. In academic librarianship, the adjectival form, diachronous, is used in the context of "diachronous obsolescence" to describe the reduction of usefulness of a book or journal volume over several years.
