= Evolutionary fauna =

The concept of the three great evolutionary faunas of marine animals from the Cambrian to the present (that is, the entire Phanerozoic) was introduced by Jack Sepkoski in 1981 using factor analysis of the fossil record. An evolutionary fauna typically displays an increase in biodiversity following a logistic curve followed by extinctions (although the Modern Fauna has not yet exhibited the diminishing part of the curve).

== Cambrian fauna ==
Fauna I, known as "Cambrian", described as a "Trilobite-rich assemblage", encompasses the bulk of the fossils which first appeared in the Cambrian explosion, and largely became extinct in the Ordovician-Silurian extinction event. This fauna comprises trilobites, small shelly fossils (grouped by Sepkoski into "Polychaeta", but including cribricyathids, coleolids, and volborthellids), Monoplacophora, inarticulate brachiopods and hyoliths.

== Paleozoic fauna ==
Fauna II, known as "Paleozoic", described as a "Brachiopod-rich assemblage", accounts for most of the fossils appearing in the Great Ordovician Biodiversification Event, and largely became extinct in the Capitanian mass extinction event and the Permian-Triassic extinction event. This fauna is marked by fossils of the following classes: Articulata, Crinoidea, Ostracoda, Cephalopoda, Anthozoa, Stenolaemata, Stelleroidea.

== Modern fauna ==
Fauna III, known as "Modern", described as a "Mollusc-rich assemblage", arose largely in the Mesozoic-Cenozoic Radiation, still in progress. The following classes are included: Gastropoda, Bivalvia, Osteichthyes, Malacostraca, Echinoidea, Gymnolaemata, Demospongiae, Chondrichthyes.

== Kindred concepts ==
In the mid-19th century, John Phillips suggested three great systems: Palaeozoic, Mesozoic and Cenozoic. Writing after Sepkoski, Brenchley and Harper suggested that there were two early evolutionary faunas before the three of Sepkoski: Ediacaran and Tomottian. They also point out similarities with four "evolutionary terrestrial plant floras": Early Vascular, Pteridophytes, Gymnospores, Angiospores; and three "evolutionary terrestrial tetrapod faunas": "Megadynasty I (Carboniferous-early Permian)" "primitive amphibians and reptiles, most notably ... Dimetrodon", "Megadynasty II (early Permian-mid-Triassic)" "mammal-like therapsids", and "Megadynasty III (late Triassic-Cretaceous)" "included the age of the dinosaurs".
