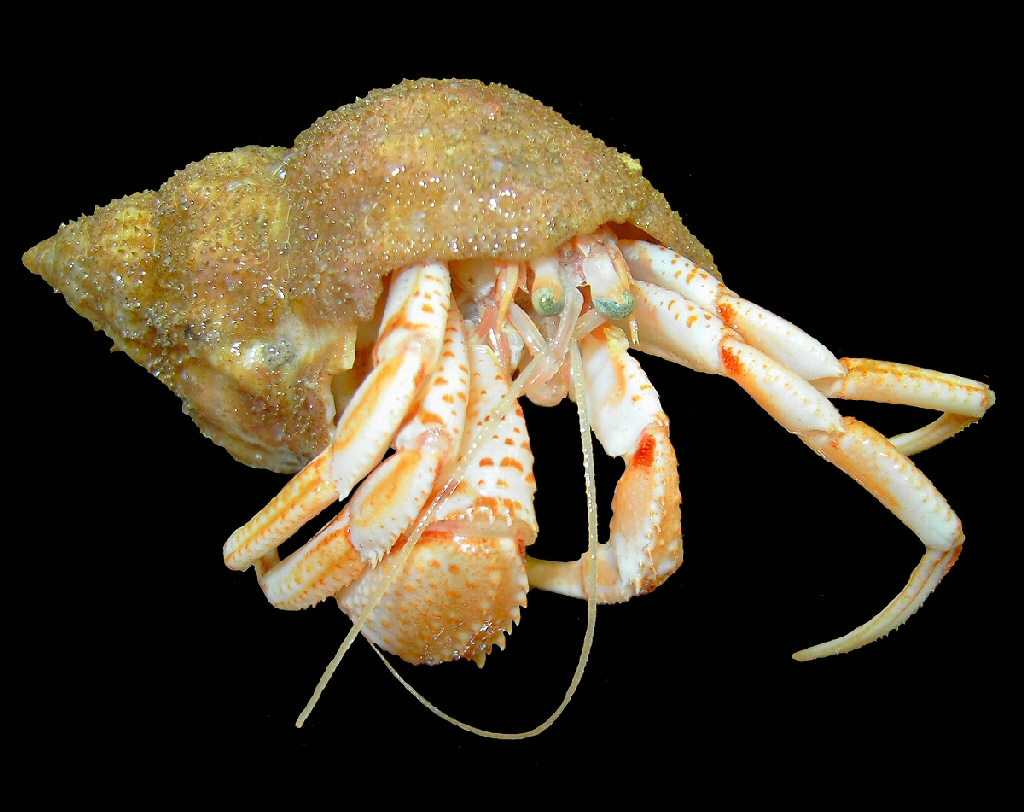
- Pagurus bernhardus

Scientific classification
- Kingdom: Animalia
- Phylum: Arthropoda
- Clade: Pancrustacea
- Class: Malacostraca
- Order: Decapoda
- Suborder: Pleocyemata
- Infraorder: Anomura
- Superfamily: Paguroidea
- Family: Paguridae; Latreille, 1802

= Paguridae =

Family of crustaceans

The Paguridae are a family of hermit crabs of the order Decapoda. The king crabs, Lithodidae, are now widely understood to be derived from deep within the Paguridae, with some authors placing their ancestors within the genus Pagurus.

== List ==
This family contains the following genera:

- Acanthopagurus de Saint Laurent, 1968
- Agaricochirus McLaughlin, 1981
- Alainopaguroides McLaughlin, 1997
- Alainopagurus Lemaitre & McLaughlin, 1995
- Alloeopagurodes Komai, 1998
- Anapagrides de Saint Laurent-Dechancé, 1966
- Anapagurus Henderson, 1886
- Anisopagurus McLaughlin, 1981
- Bathypaguropsis McLaughlin, 1994
- Boninpagurus Asakura & Tachikawa, 2004
- Bythiopagurus McLaughlin, 2003
- †Capsulapagurus Fraaije, Van Bakel, Iserbyt & Jagt, 2011
- Catapaguroides A. Milne-Edwards & Bouvier, 1892
- Catapaguropsis Lemaitre & McLaughlin, 2006
- Catapagurus A. Milne-Edwards, 1880
- Ceratopagurus Yokoya, 1933
- Cestopagurus Bouvier, 1897
- Chanopagurus Lemaitre, 2003
- Cycetopagurus McLaughlin, 2004
- Decaphyllus de Saint Laurent, 1968
- Dentalopagurus McLaughlin, 2007
- Diacanthurus McLaughlin & Forest, 1997
- Discorsopagurus McLaughlin, 1974
- Elassochirus Benedict, 1892
- Enallopaguropsis McLaughlin, 1981
- Enallopagurus McLaughlin, 1981
- Enneobranchus Garcia-Gomez, 1988
- Enneopagurus McLaughlin, 1997
- Enneophyllus McLaughlin, 1997
- Eutrichopagurus Komai, 2015
- Forestopagurus Garcia-Gomez, 1995
- †Goniochirus Étallon, 1861
- Goreopagurus McLaughlin, 1988
- Hachijopagurus Osawa & Okuno, 2003
- Haigiopagurus McLaughlin, 2005
- Icelopagurus McLaughlin, 1997
- Iridopagurus de Saint Laurent-Dechance, 1966
- Kumepagurus Komai & Osawa, 2012
- Labidochirus Benedict, 1892
- Lithopagurus Provenzano, 1968
- †Litorepagurus Fraaije, Van Bakel, Jagt, Wallaard & De Coninck, 2023
- Lophopagurus McLaughlin, 1981
- Manucomplanus McLaughlin, 1981
- Michelopagurus McLaughlin, 1997
- Micropagurus McLaughlin, 1986
- Munidopagurus A. Milne-Edwards, 1880
- Nematopaguroides Forest & de Saint Laurent, 1968
- Nematopagurus Milne-Edwards & Bouvier, 1892
- †Orbispagurus De Angeli & Caporiondo, 2017
- †Orhomalus Étallon, 1861
- Orthopagurus Stevens, 1927
- Ostraconotus A. Milne-Edwards, 1880
- Pagurellus Lemaitre, Felder & Poupin, 2017
- Paguridium Forest, 1961
- Pagurina Lemaitre, Felder & Poupin, 2017
- Paguriscus Lemaitre, Felder & Poupin, 2017
- Paguritta Melin, 1939
- Pagurixus Melin, 1939
- Pagurodes Henderson, 1888
- Pagurodofleinia Asakura, 2005
- Pagurojacquesia de Saint Laurent & McLaughlin, 2000
- Paguruncio Lemaitre, Felder & Poupin, 2017
- Pagurus Fabricius, 1775
- †Palaeopagurus Van Straelen, 1925
- †Paracapsulapagurus Hyžný, Fraaije, Martin, Perrier & Sarr, 2016
- Parapagurodes McLaughlin & Haig, 1973
- Patagurus Anker & Paulay, 2013
- Phimochirus McLaughlin, 1981
- Porcellanopagurus Filhol, 1985
- Propagurus McLaughlin & de Saint Laurent, 1998
- Protoniopagurus Lemaitre & McLaughlin, 1996
- †Protopagurus Fraaije, Robins, Van Bakel, Jagt & Bachmayer, 2019
- Pseudopagurodes McLaughlin, 1997
- Pteropagurus McLaughlin & Rahayu, 2006
- Pumilopagurus McLaughlin & Rahayu, 2008
- Pusillopagurus Lemaitre, Felder & Poupin, 2017
- Pygmaeopagurus McLaughlin, 1986
- Pylopaguridium McLaughlin & Lemaitre, 2001
- Pylopaguropsis Alcock, 1905
- Pylopagurus A. Milne-Edwards & Bouvier, 1891
- Raripagurus Lemaitre & Felder, 2023
- Rhodochirus McLaughlin, 1981
- Scopaeopagurus McLaughlin & Hogarth, 1998
- Solenopagurus de Saint Laurent, 1968
- Solitariopagurus Türkay, 1986
- Spathapagurus Lemaitre & Felder, 2011
- Spiropagurus Stimpson, 1858
- Tarrasopagurus McLaughlin, 1997
- Tomopaguroides Balss, 1912
- Tomopaguropsis Alcock, 1905
- Tomopagurus A. Milne-Edwards & Bouvier, 1893
- Trichopagurus de Saint Laurent, 1968
- Turleania McLaughlin, 1997
- †Viapagurus Ferratges & Zamora in García-Penas, Ferratges, Moreno-Bedmar, Bover-Arnal, Gasca, Aurell & Zamora, 2023
- Vounopagurus Komai, Rahayu & Fujita, 2021
