= Periclimenes dardanicola =

Scientific classification
- Domain: Eukaryota
- Kingdom: Animalia
- Phylum: Arthropoda
- Class: Malacostraca
- Order: Decapoda
- Suborder: Pleocyemata
- Infraorder: Caridea
- Family: Palaemonidae
- Genus: Periclimenes
- Species: P. dardanicola

Binomial name
- Periclimenes dardanicola Bruce & Okuno, 2006

Species of crustacean

Periclimenes dardanicola is a species of shrimp found in the western Pacific Ocean. It lives in association with sea anemones that live on the gastropod shells carried by hermit crabs. It was first named by Alexander J. Bruce and Junji Okuno in 2006. It is mainly white, and grows up to a carapace length of 4 mm (0.16 in).

== Description ==
P. dardanicola grows to a carapace length of 2–4 millimetres (0.08–0.16 in), and can be distinguished from related species, including the similar Periclimenes parvus by the form of the carapace, and by the relative lengths of the parts of the first pereiopod. The animal is chiefly white, with red along the edges of the carapace and the abdominal somites. The legs are transparent yellow, with red bands.

== Ecology ==
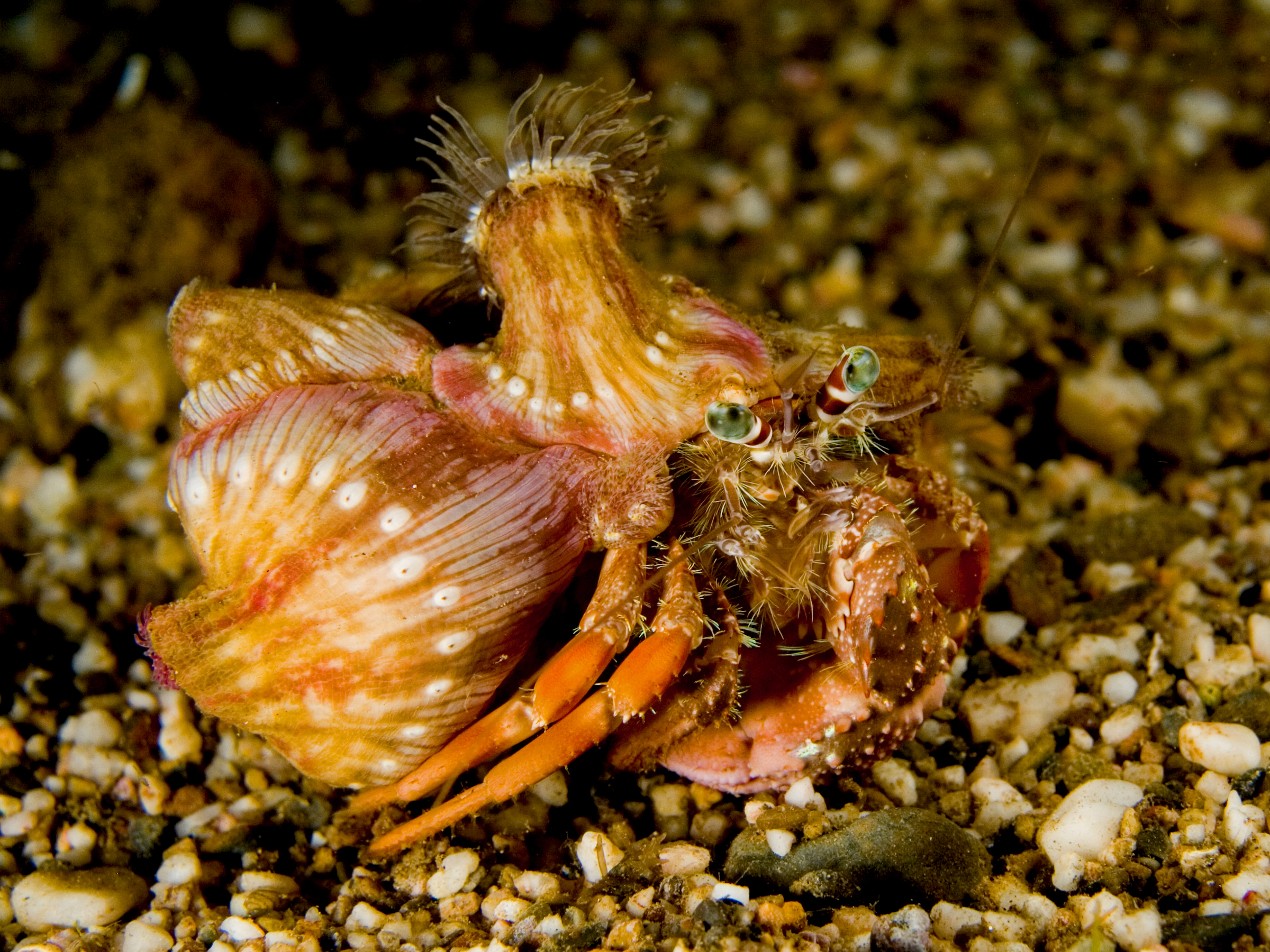
Dardanus pedunculatus carrying sea anemones of the genus Calliactis – the host for Periclimenes dardanicola

P. dardanicola is associated with the sea anemone Calliactis, which is carried by hermit crabs of the genus Dardanus, including Dardanus arrosor, D. crassimanus, D. lagopodes and D. pedunculatus. This is one of the few examples of ecological associations between two species of decapod crustaceans.

== Distribution ==
Specimens of Periclimenes dardanicola have been collected from various locations in the western Pacific Ocean, namely Suruga Bay (Japan), Vietnam, and Borneo (Indonesia).

== Taxonomic history ==
Although only formally described in 2006, this species has been recognised as distinct since 1993, and has been featured in illustrated popular science books from 1986 onwards. Its members were formerly considered part of Periclimenes parvus, which is now considered to only occur at its type locality, off the island of New Britain, Papua New Guinea.

The specific epithet dardanicola refers to the species' association with members of the genus Dardanus, with "dardani-" referring to the genus, and "cola" being the Latin word for "dweller".
