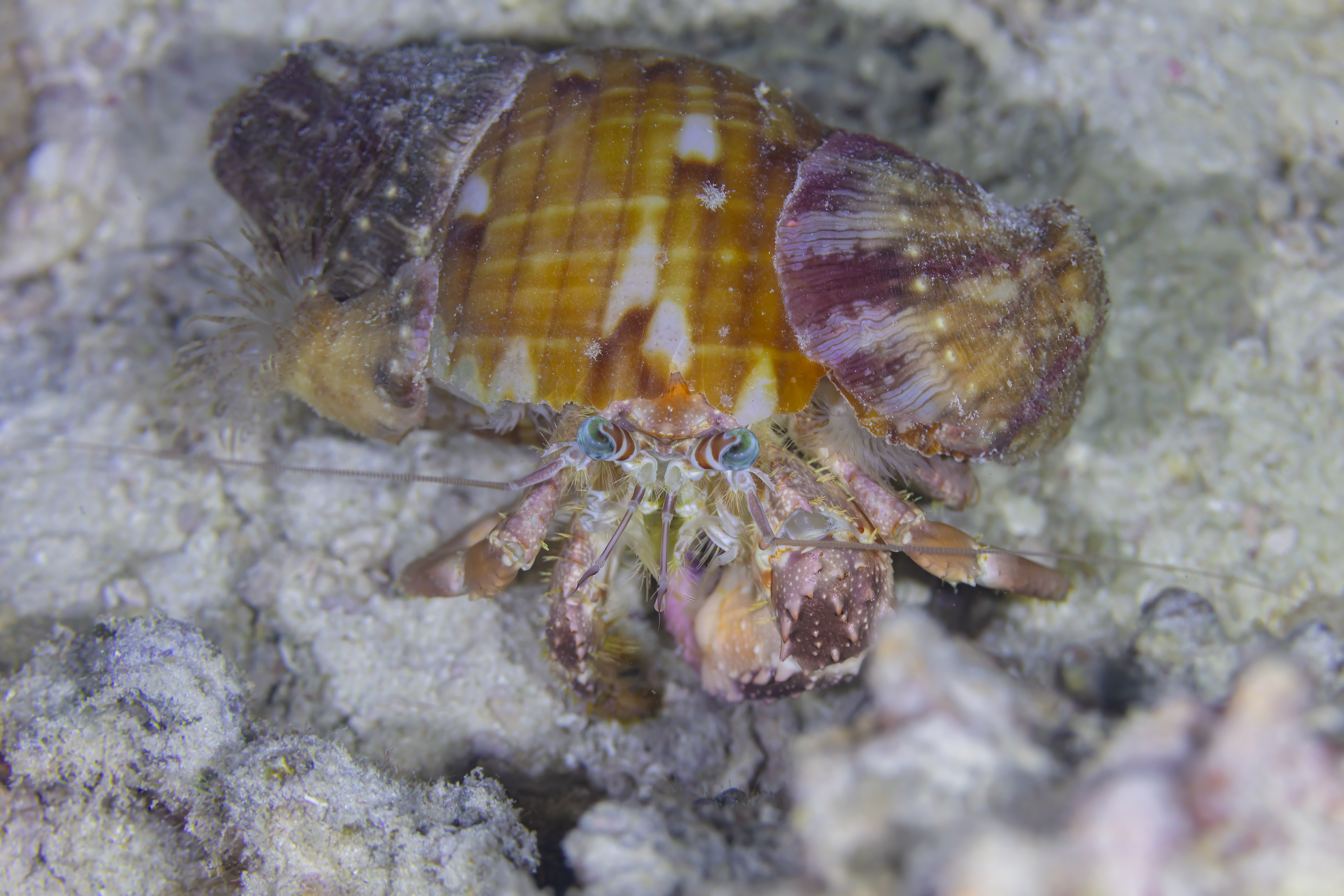

Scientific classification
- Domain: Eukaryota
- Kingdom: Animalia
- Phylum: Arthropoda
- Class: Malacostraca
- Order: Decapoda
- Suborder: Pleocyemata
- Infraorder: Anomura
- Family: Diogenidae
- Genus: Dardanus
- Species: D. deformis

Binomial name
- Dardanus deformis (H. Milne Edwards, 1836)

= Dardanus deformis =

Species of crustacean

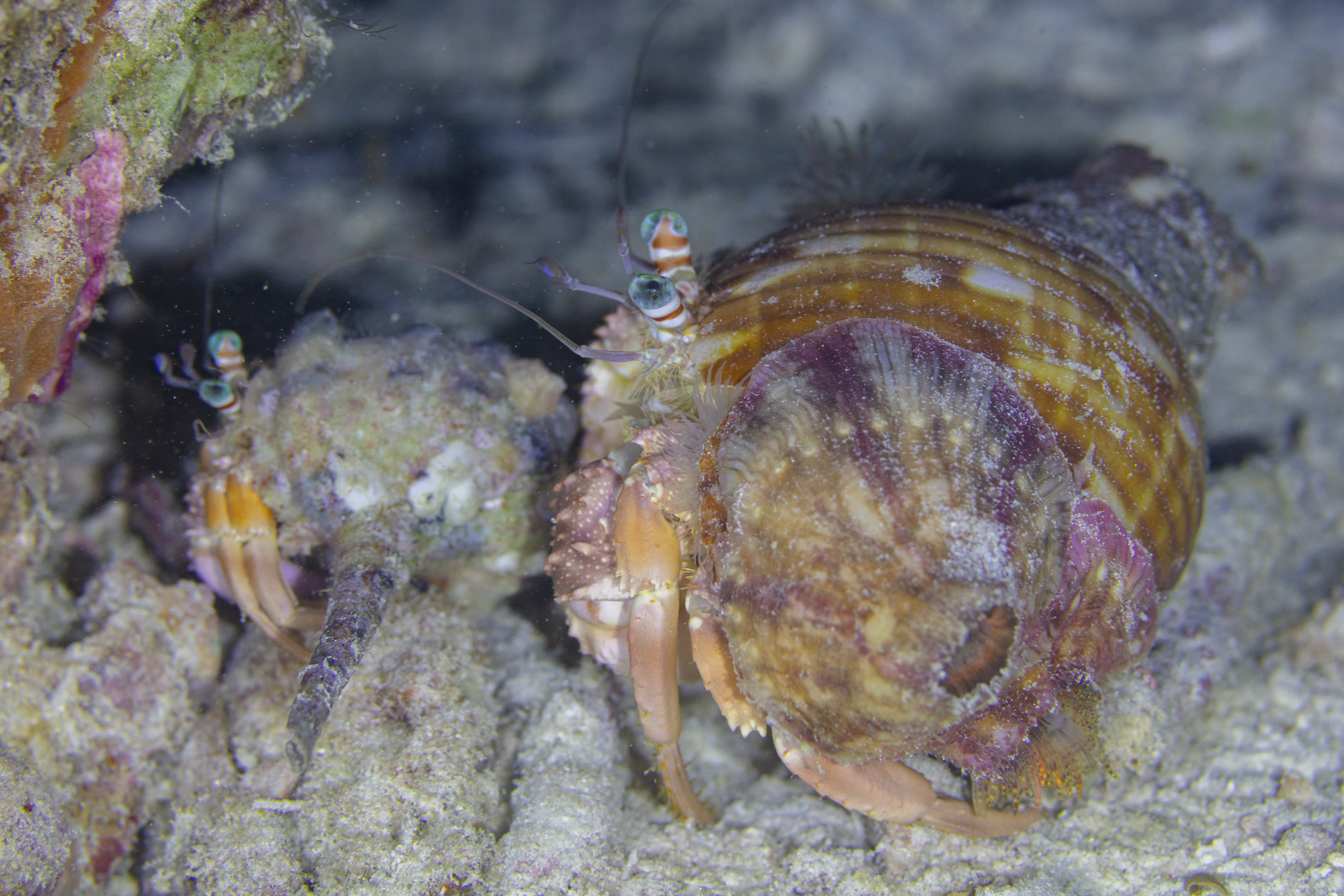
Couple of hermit crabs off the coast of Zanzibar (Tanzania)

Dardanus deformis is a species of nocturnal hermit crab that is found in the Indo-Pacific. Its common name is pale anemone hermit. The species is known to transfer sea anemones from one shell to another when it moves to a different shell. It can be kept in an aquarium.

== Habitat ==
The crab can be found under dead coral in a lagoon alongside sea anemones. It lives in the low intertidal zones or subtidal zones. Locations that the species can be found in include the Cocos (Keeling) Islands, the Tasman Sea, and the Indo-west Pacific Oceans.

== Sea anemones ==
The crab carries Calliactis anemones on the dorsal surface of its shell as well as the anemone Verrillactis paguri on the aperture of its shell. When the crab moves to a new shell, it transfers V. paguri from the old one to the new one on the same area as before, along with the Calliactis anemones. The hermit crab is one of at least 24 species that transfer over sea anemones to a new shell. The placement of the V. paguri might protect the crabs from having their chilepeds and legs eaten by predators such as fish and octopuses. This behavior was first studied in 1920, but with no specific anemones mentioned.

== Breeding ==
In a 2003 study of the species' breeding season at Maputo Bay, it was found that the crabs breed with peaks of spawning from August to October and a small decrease from May to July. The study concluded that rainfall is the main factor that controls its breeding activity.

== Captivity ==
The species can usually be kept in an aquarium with many other invertebrates, but it has been known to attack Caulerpa algae. The process of transferring anemones to another shell can also happen in an aquarium. While in captivity, the species does well in dim light and eats either frozen, flake, or tablet food.
