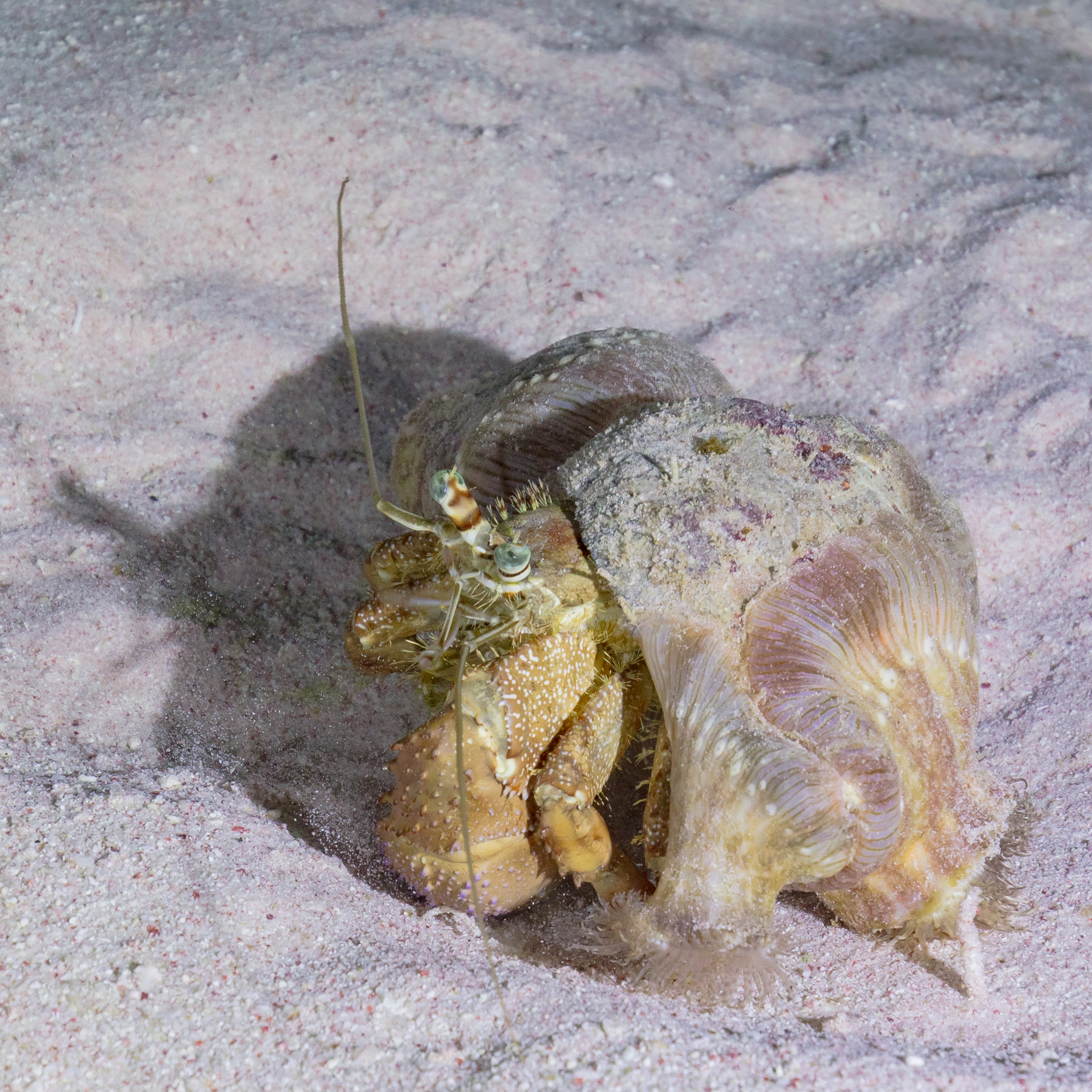

Scientific classification
- Kingdom: Animalia
- Phylum: Cnidaria
- Subphylum: Anthozoa
- Class: Hexacorallia
- Order: Actiniaria
- Family: Hormathiidae
- Genus: Calliactis
- Species: C. p.

Binomial name
- Calliactis polypus (Forsskål, 1775)

Synonyms
- List: Actinia decorata Couthouy in Dana, 1846; Actinia maculata; Actinia polypus; Adamsia decorata; Adamsia miriam Haddon & Shackleton, 1893; Calliactis decorata (Drayton in Dana, 1849); Calliactis miriam Haddon & Shackleton, 1893; Cribrina polypus Ehrenberg; Priapus polypus Forsskål, 1775

= Calliactis polypus =

Species of sea anemone

Calliactis polypus is a species of sea anemone in the family Hormathiidae. It is usually found living on the surface of a sea snail shell in which a hermit crab is living.

== Description ==
C. polypus can grow up to 8 cm (3 in) long. Several anemones can grow on one shell. The base is wide with wavy edges and pink striations and flares out over the shell surface. The column is wider at the base than further up and has pale brown and white patches and longitudinal striations. The oral disc has several whorls of long brownish translucent tentacles with paler bases surrounding the mouth.

== Distribution ==
C. polypus is found in the Indo-Pacific area and the Red Sea. It lives in the neritic zone at depths down to about 25 metres (80 ft).

== Ecology ==
C. polypus lives as a commensal with several species of hermit crab including Dardanus gemmatus. The anemone shows no inclination to attach itself to a gastropod shell with or without a hermit crab. However the crab shows great interest in the anemone and taps and massages the base of the column with its legs until the anemone relaxes and the pedal disc becomes detached. The crab then picks up the anemone and holds it against the shell in which it is living. Both the pedal disc and the tentacles are very sticky and either can quickly form a firm attachment to the shell.
