= Dardanus cyprioticus =

Dardanus cyprioticus Temporal range: Serravallian–Messinian

Scientific classification
- Kingdom: Animalia
- Phylum: Arthropoda
- Clade: Pancrustacea
- Class: Malacostraca
- Order: Decapoda
- Suborder: Pleocyemata
- Infraorder: Anomura
- Family: Diogenidae
- Genus: Dardanus
- Species: †D. cyprioticus

Binomial name
- †Dardanus cyprioticus Wallaard et al., 2023

Extinct species of crustacean

Dardanus cyprioticus is an extinct species of Dardanus that lived during the Miocene epoch.

== Distribution ==
Dardanus cyprioticus is known from fossils found in Cyprus.
