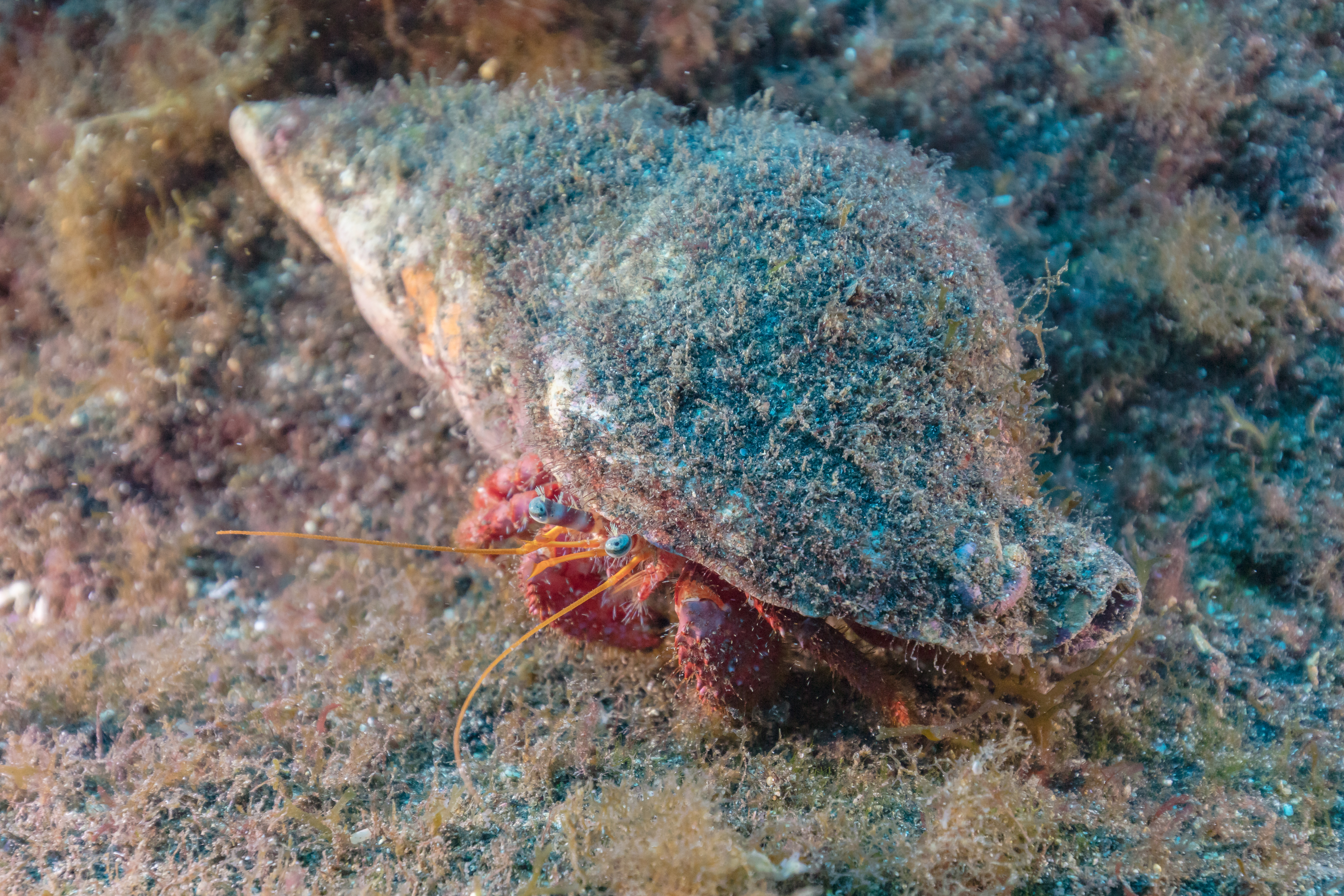
- Dardanus calidus using a Triton's trumpet (Charonia tritonis) as protection

Scientific classification
- Domain: Eukaryota
- Kingdom: Animalia
- Phylum: Arthropoda
- Class: Malacostraca
- Order: Decapoda
- Suborder: Pleocyemata
- Infraorder: Anomura
- Family: Diogenidae
- Genus: Dardanus
- Species: D. calidus

Binomial name
- Dardanus calidus (Risso, 1827)

Synonyms
- Pagurus calidus Risso, 1827

= Dardanus calidus =

Species of crustacean

Dardanus calidus is a species of hermit crab from the East Atlantic (Portugal to Senegal) and Mediterranean Sea.

== Description ==
D. calidus can grow to a length of 12 centimetres (4.7 in). It uses large gastropod shells, such as those of Tonna galea and Charonia species, which it often decorates with one or more sea anemones of the species Calliactis parasitica. The relationship with the anemone is truly symbiotic, since the anemone gains scraps of food from the hermit crab, while the crab benefits from the anemone's stinging tentacles deterring predators.

== Distribution and ecology ==
Dardanus calidus is a scavenger, feeding on decaying matter from the sea bed.

It has been collected from depths greater than 100 metres (330 ft), but is more typically found in shallower water.

== Taxonomic history ==
Dardanus calidus was first described by Antoine Risso in 1827, under the name Pagurus calidus, and was transferred to the genus Dardanus by Jacques Forest in 1958. The larval form Glaucothoë rostrata, described by Edward J. Miers in 1881, has also been assigned to D. calidus.
