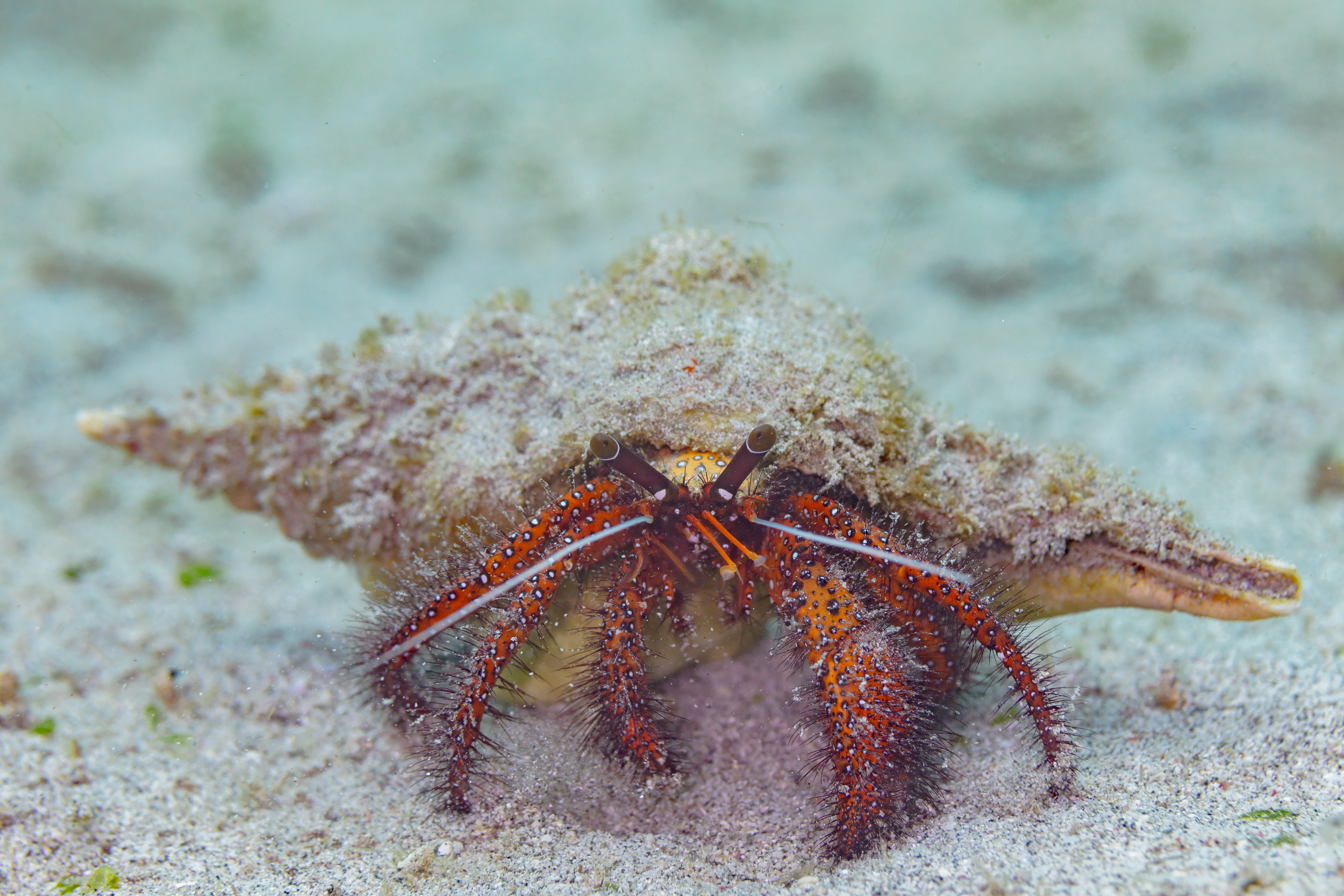
- Dardanus megistos wearing triton, in Anilao, Philippines

Scientific classification
- Kingdom: Animalia
- Phylum: Arthropoda
- Class: Malacostraca
- Order: Decapoda
- Suborder: Pleocyemata
- Infraorder: Anomura
- Family: Diogenidae
- Genus: Dardanus
- Species: D. megistos

Binomial name
- Dardanus megistos J. F. W. Herbst, 1804

Synonyms
- Dardanus spinimanus (H. Milne Edwards, 1848); Pagurus punctulatus Miers, 1879; Pagurus spinimanus H. Milne Edwards, 1848

= Dardanus megistos =

Species of crustacean

Dardanus megistos, the white-spotted hermit crab or spotted hermit crab, is a species of hermit crab belonging to the family Diogenidae.

== Etymology ==
The genus name Dardanus refers to the son of Zeus and Electra in Greek mythology, while the species name megistos is the superlative of the Greek word mega, therefore it means the largest.

== Distribution ==
This species is present in the Indo-Pacific region from East Africa to the South China Sea, Australia and east to Hawaii.

Dardanus megistos from Maldives. Video clip

== Habitat ==
These tropical reef-associated crabs occur in coral reef, lagoons, rocky platforms, sand and seagrass beds, from littoral and subtidal zones to deep waters, at depths up to 50 m.

== Description ==
Dardanus megistos can reach a body length of about 20 cm (7.9 in). These large crabs have a bright red body with small white eyespots surrounded by black. Their bodies are covered with long erect coarse hairs of a dark red color. They have a pair of long white primary antennae or antennules, a pair of secondary antennae, stalked green brown eyes and three pairs of mouth appendages. The stalks of the eyes are reddish with a basal white spot. The soft, asymmetrical abdomen is spiral-shaped, useful in keeping in the shell, with a five-piece tail (telson and uropods). Like all decapod crustaceans, they have ten legs. The first pair of legs carries the pincers ( chelipeds). The left plier is bigger than the right one.

== Biology ==
The white-spotted hermit crabs are gonochorics, the eggs are carried on the female's abdomen. They also are opportunistic omnivore, mainly feeding on small invertebrates (worms, molluscs, etc.) and they are also reported to feed on holothurians. Commonly these crabs perform a precopulatory courtship ritual. Usually the sperm transfer is indirect. They may live up to 30 years. These crustaceans usually inhabit a large shell of a gastropod, consequently only the cephalothorax and the first three pairs of legs are visible.

== Gallery ==
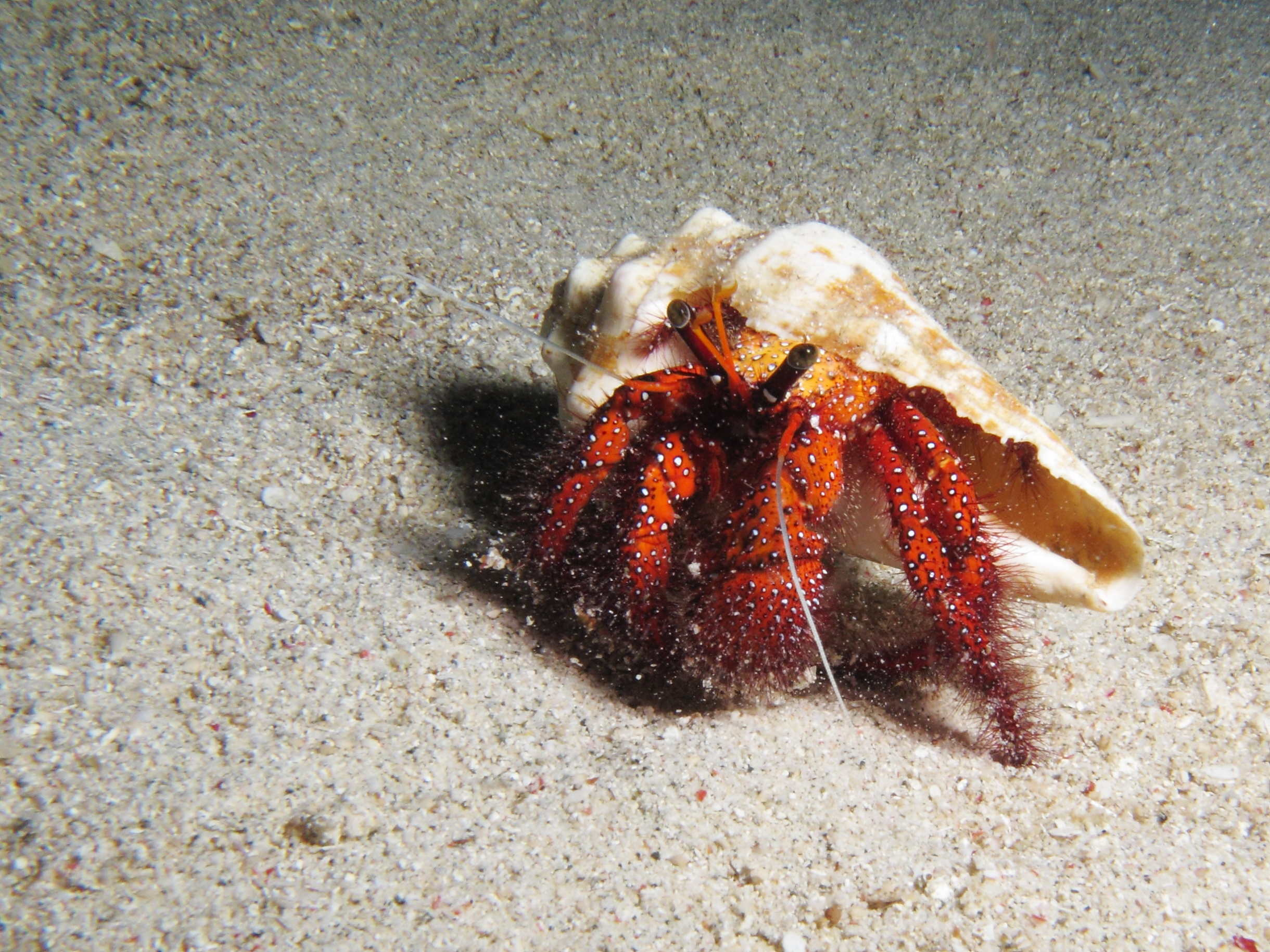
D. megistos at Komodo, Indonesia

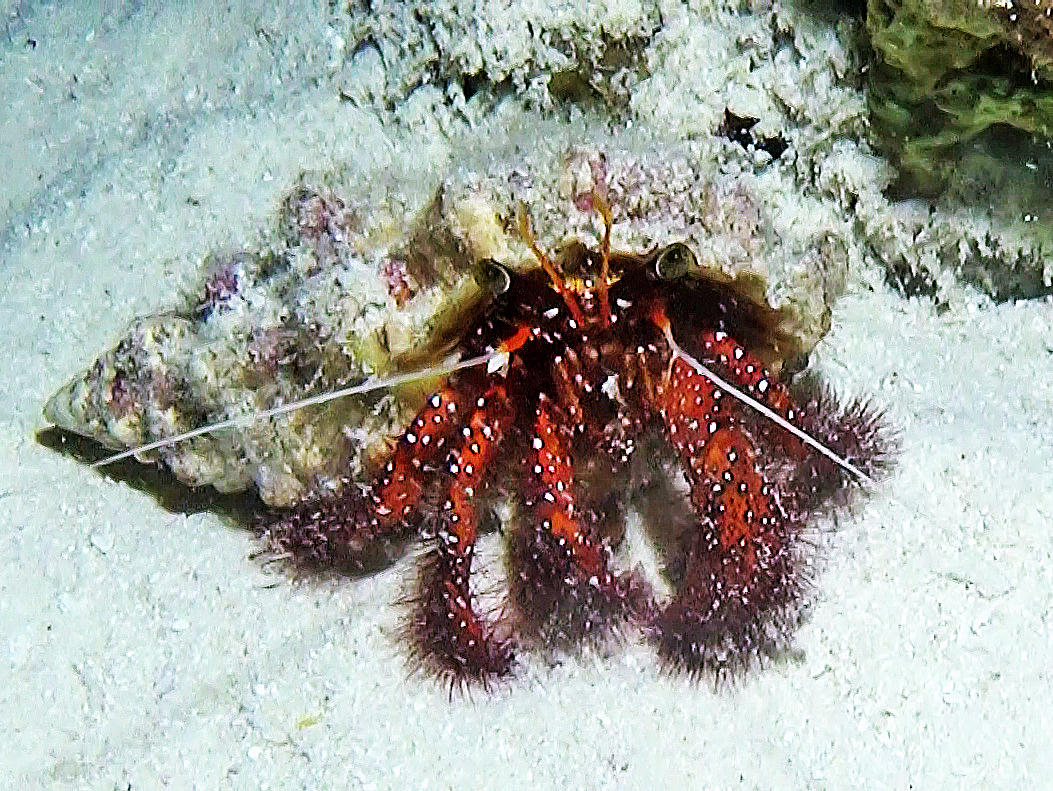
D. megistos at Maldives

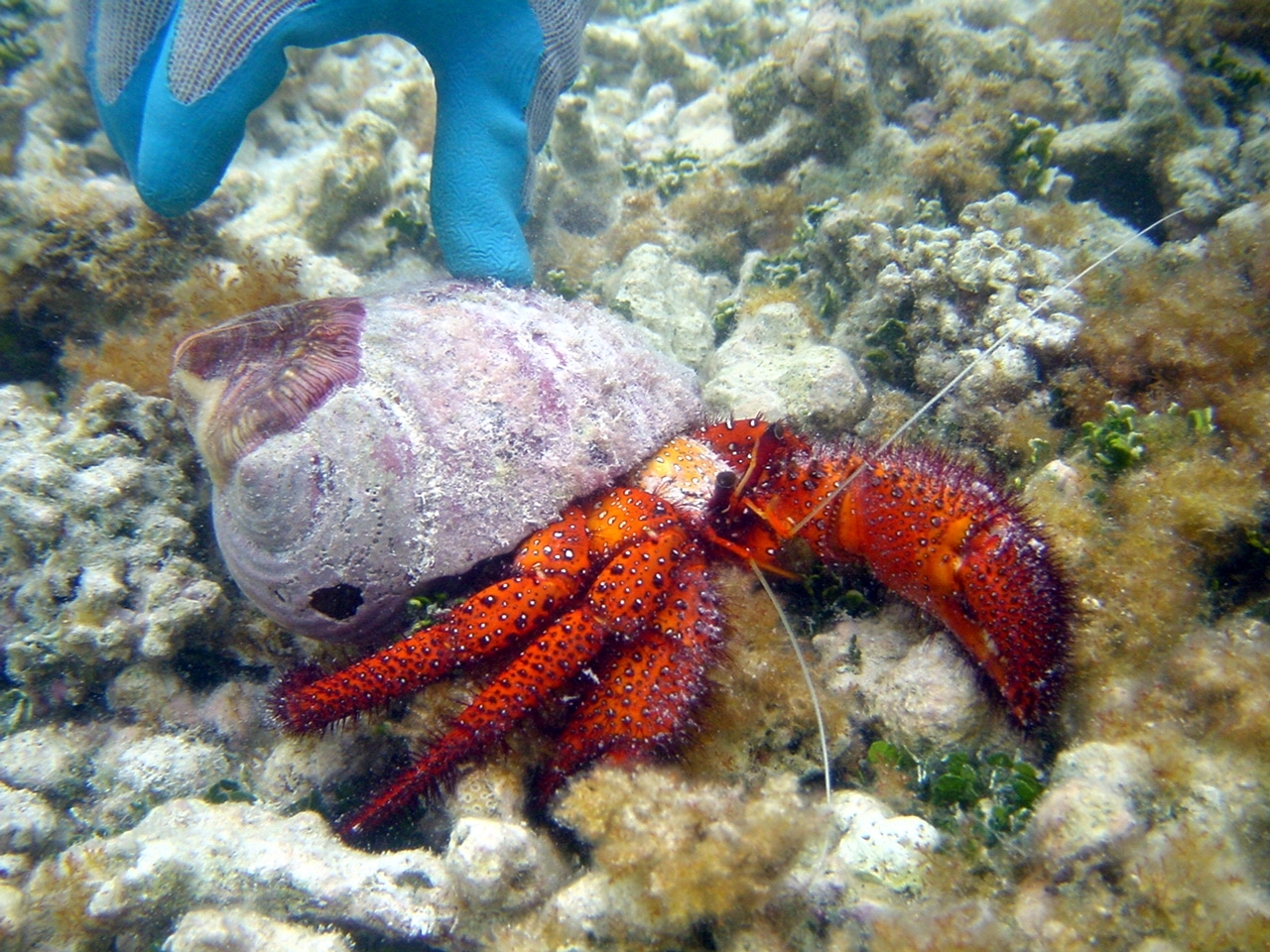
D. megistos at Northwest Hawaiian Islands

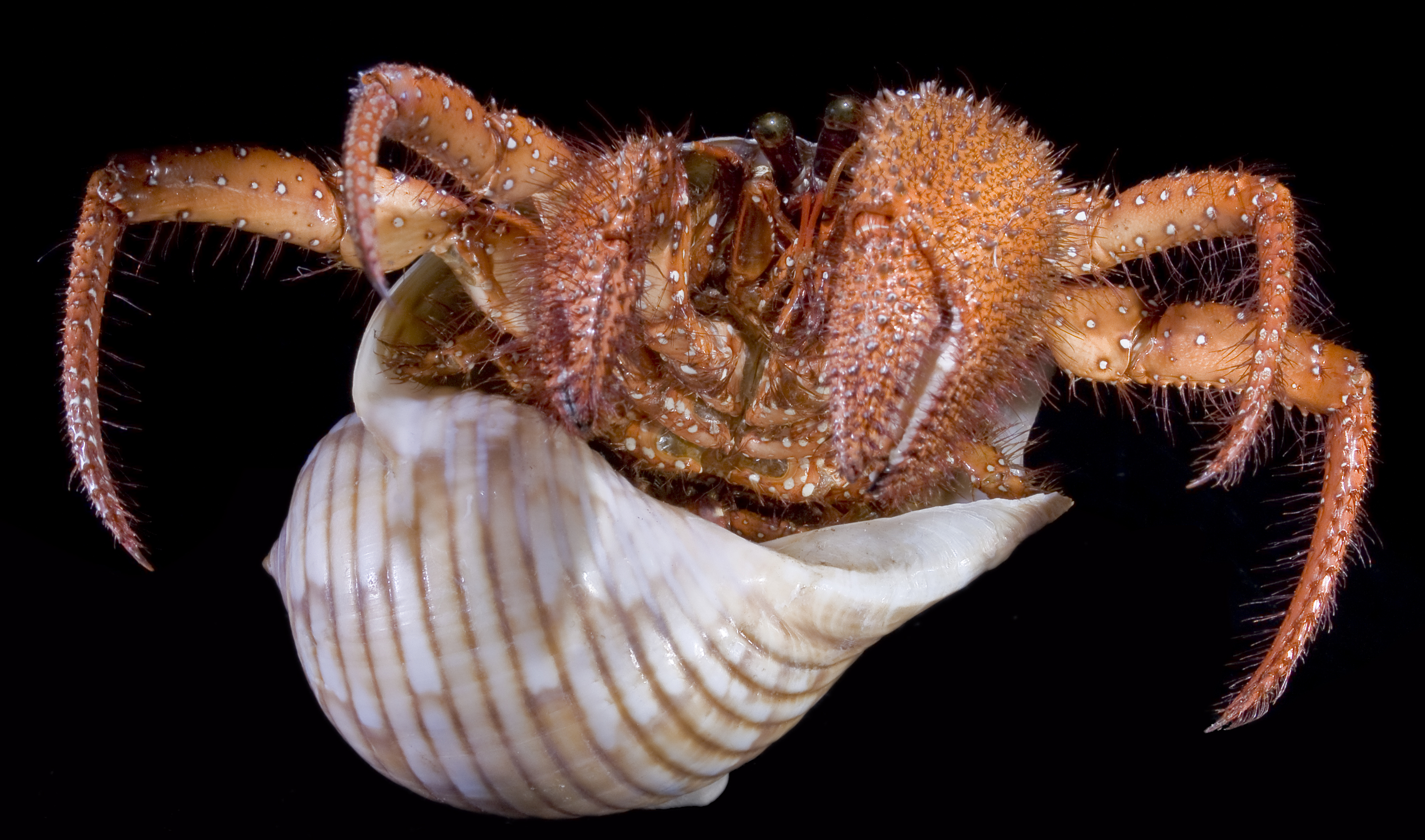
D. megistos at Aliguay Island Philippines

== Bibliography ==
- Barnes, D.K.A. and R.J. Arnold 2001 Ecology of subtropical hermit crabs in S.W. Madagascar: cluster structure and function. Mar. Biol. 139:463-474.
- Fize, A. & Serène, R. 1955. Les Pagures du Vietnam. Vietnam : Institut Océanographique de Nhatrang 228 pp., 6 pls.
- Liu, J.Y. [Ruiyu] (ed.). (2008). Checklist of marine biota of China seas. China Science Press. 1267 pp.
- McLaughlin, P. A.; Komai, T.; Lemaitre, R.; Rahayu, D.L. (2010). Annotated checklist of anomuran decapod crustaceans of the world (exclusive of the Kiwaoidea and families Chirostylidae and Galatheidae of the Galatheoidea. Part I – Lithodoidea, Lomisoidea and Paguroidea. The Raffles Bulletin of Zoology. Suppl. 23: 5-107.
- Milne Edwards, H. 1848. Sur quelques nouvelles espèces du genre Pagure. Annales des Sciences Naturelles, Paris 10: 59-64
- Olivier, A.G. 1811. Pagure. pp. 636-649 in Olivier, A.G. (ed.). Encyclopédie Méthodique. Histoire Naturelle. Insectes. Paris : H. Agasse Vol. 8 772 pp.
- Reay, P.J. & J. Haig (1990). Coastal hermit crabs (Decapoda: Anomura) from Kenya, with a review and key to East African species. Bulletin of Marine Science 46(3): 578-589
- Sakai, K. 1999. J. F. W. Herbst-Collection of decapod Crustacea of the Berlin Zoological Museum, with remarks on certain species. Naturalists, Tokushima Biological Laboratory, Shikoku University 6: 1-45 pls 1-21
- Tudge, C.C. 1995. Hermit Crabs of the Great Barrier Reef and Coastal Queensland. Brisbane : University of Queensland and Backhuys Publishers 40 pp.
