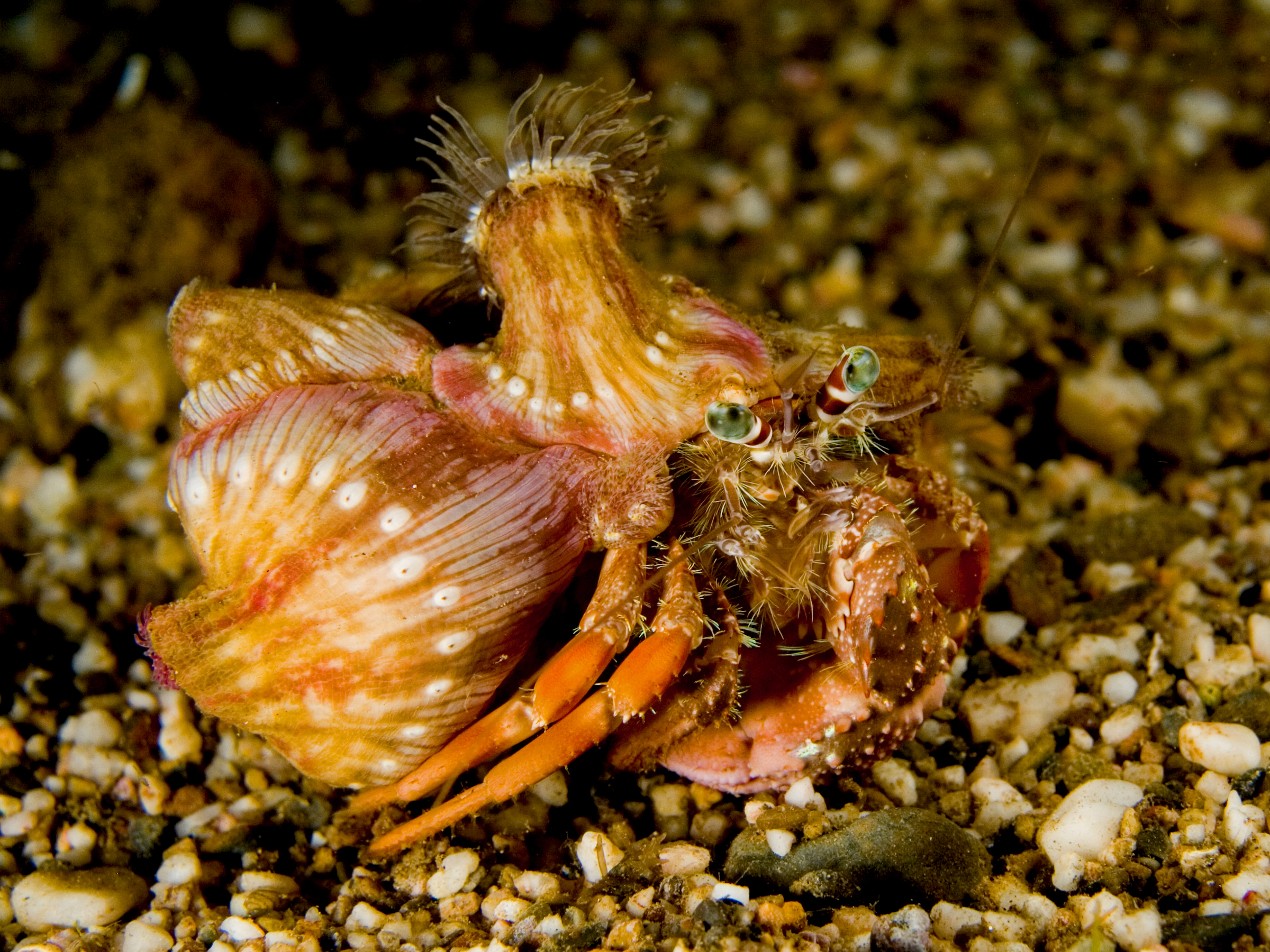
- Hermit crab (Dardanus pedunculatus) with Calliactis species attached to its shell.

Scientific classification
- Domain: Eukaryota
- Kingdom: Animalia
- Phylum: Cnidaria
- Class: Hexacorallia
- Order: Actiniaria
- Family: Hormathiidae
- Genus: Calliactis; Verrill, 1869

Species
- See text

Synonyms
- Calliactus

= Calliactis =

Genus of sea anemones

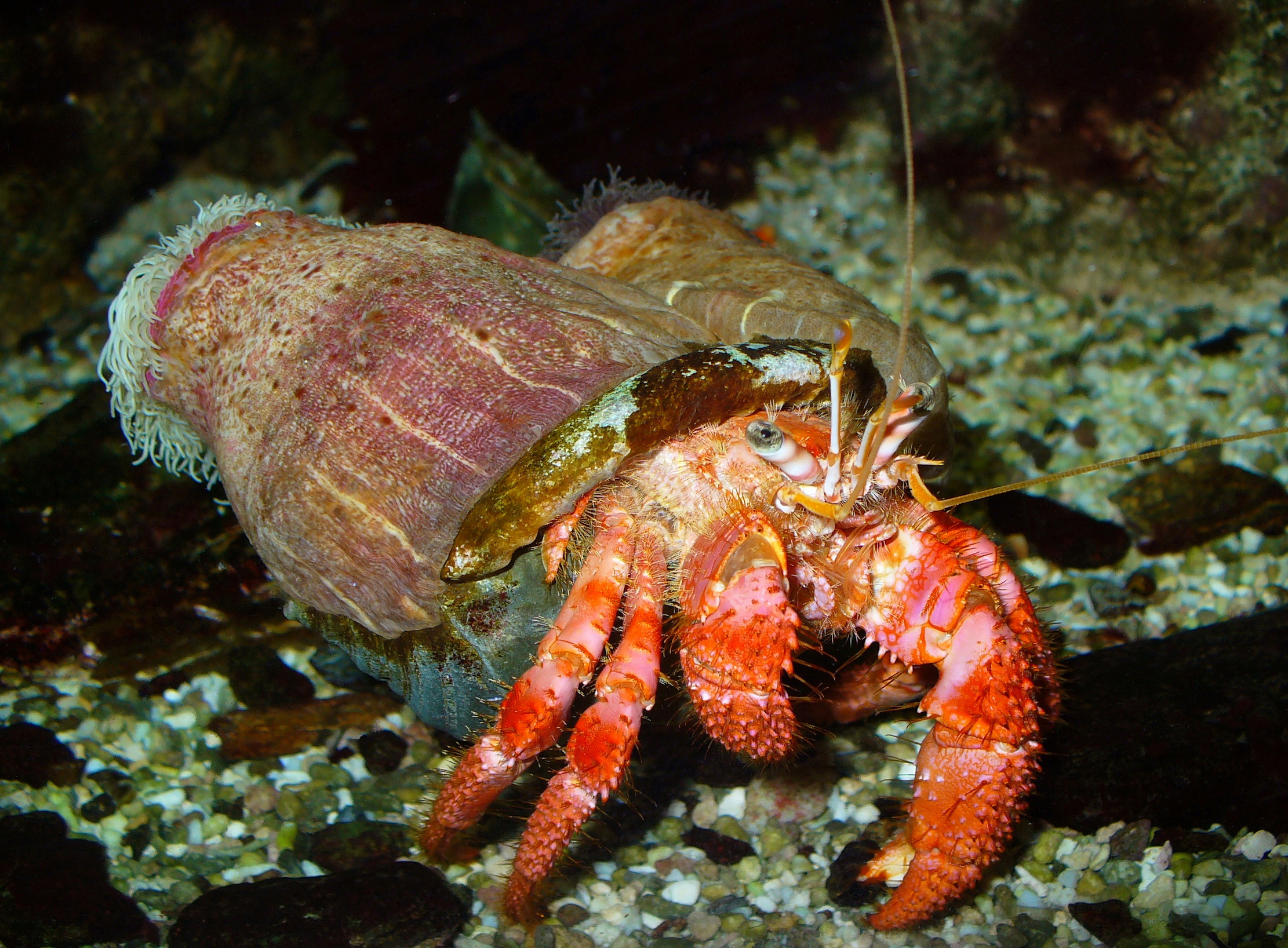
Calliactis parasitica on the hermit crab Dardanus calidus

Calliactis is a genus of sea anemones. Species in this genus are mutually symbiotic with hermit crabs. The anemone gets a place to live and discarded scraps of the crab's food in exchange for its help in defending the crab.

== Species ==
Species within the genus include:

- Calliactis algoaensis
- Calliactis androgyna
- Calliactis annulata
- Calliactis argentacoloratus
- Calliactis armillatas
- Calliactis brevicornis
- Calliactis conchicola
- Calliactis japonica
- Calliactis marmorata
- Calliactis parasitica
- Calliactis polypores
- Calliactis polypus
- Calliactis reticulata
- Calliactis sinensis
- Calliactis tricolor
- Calliactis valdiviae
- Calliactis variegata
- Calliactis xishaensis
