= Calitoxin =

Identifiers
| CAS Number | 118354-83-9 |
| Abbreviations | CLX |
| ChemSpider | none |
| CompTox Dashboard (EPA) | DTXSID30897122 |
- InChI: InChI=1S/C203H300N56O71S7/c1-18-94(8)156(209)195(321)233-118(49-52-151(279)280)171(297)249-136-83-332-337-88-141-193(319)252-140(191(317)239-126(65-108-73-211-90-219-108)178(304)231-117(47-50-143(207)270)168(294)223-98(12)203(329)330)87-336-334-85-138-188(314)227-113(35-24-27-54-204)165(291)214-74-145(272)213-75-146(273)224-128(67-152(281)282)167(293)216-77-148(275)226-132(79-260)184(310)237-124(63-106-71-212-112-34-23-22-33-111(106)112)177(303)246-133(80-261)185(311)228-114(36-25-28-55-205)169(295)248-139(192(318)240-127(66-144(208)271)183(309)258-162(102(16)267)200(326)243-123(62-105-41-45-110(269)46-42-105)182(308)257-161(101(15)266)199(325)221-96(10)164(290)254-157(92(4)5)197(323)220-95(9)163(289)234-130(69-154(285)286)181(307)250-141)86-335-333-84-137(247-170(296)115(229-189(136)315)37-26-29-56-206)190(316)230-116(48-51-150(277)278)166(292)215-76-147(274)225-129(68-153(283)284)173(299)222-97(11)202(328)259-57-30-38-142(259)194(320)241-131(70-155(287)288)180(306)235-120(59-91(2)3)174(300)244-134(81-262)186(312)238-125(64-107-72-210-89-218-107)179(305)232-119(53-58-331-17)172(298)256-159(99(13)264)196(322)217-78-149(276)253-160(100(14)265)201(327)255-158(93(6)7)198(324)242-122(61-104-39-43-109(268)44-40-104)175(301)236-121(60-103-31-20-19-21-32-103)176(302)245-135(82-263)187(313)251-138/h19-23,31-34,39-46,71-73,89-102,113-142,156-162,212,260-269H,18,24-30,35-38,47-70,74-88,204-206,209H2,1-17H3,(H2,207,270)(H2,208,271)(H,210,218)(H,211,219)(H,213,272)(H,214,291)(H,215,292)(H,216,293)(H,217,322)(H,220,323)(H,221,325)(H,222,299)(H,223,294)(H,224,273)(H,225,274)(H,226,275)(H,227,314)(H,228,311)(H,229,315)(H,230,316)(H,231,304)(H,232,305)(H,233,321)(H,234,289)(H,235,306)(H,236,301)(H,237,310)(H,238,312)(H,239,317)(H,240,318)(H,241,320)(H,242,324)(H,243,326)(H,244,300)(H,245,302)(H,246,303)(H,247,296)(H,248,295)(H,249,297)(H,250,307)(H,251,313)(H,252,319)(H,253,276)(H,254,290)(H,255,327)(H,256,298)(H,257,308)(H,258,309)(H,277,278)(H,279,280)(H,281,282)(H,283,284)(H,285,286)(H,287,288)(H,329,330)/t94-,95-,96-,97-,98-,99+,100+,101+,102+,113-,114-,115-,116-,117-,118-,119-,120-,121-,122-,123-,124-,125-,126-,127-,128-,129-,130-,131-,132-,133-,134-,135-,136-,137-,138-,139-,140-,141-,142-,156-,157-,158-,159-,160-,161-,162-/m0/s1 Key: MUNBOAGKTVFZHN-YORKNKFOSA-N; InChI=1S/C204H305N57O69S7/c1-18-96(8)157(211)196(321)235-120(51-53-152(279)280)172(297)251-139-86-333-337-90-143-194(319)254-142(192(317)241-128(67-110-75-213-92-221-110)179(304)233-119(50-52-145(209)272)169(294)225-100(12)204(329)330)89-336-334-87-140-190(315)229-115(37-24-28-55-205)166(291)216-76-147(274)215-77-148(275)226-130(69-153(281)282)168(293)218-79-150(277)228-134(81-262)185(310)239-126(65-108-73-214-114-36-23-22-35-113(108)114)178(303)248-135(82-263)186(311)231-117(39-26-30-57-207)170(295)250-141(193(318)242-129(68-146(210)273)184(309)260-163(104(16)269)201(326)245-125(64-107-44-48-112(271)49-45-107)183(308)259-162(103(15)268)200(325)223-98(10)165(290)256-158(94(4)5)198(323)222-97(9)164(289)236-132(71-155(285)286)182(307)252-143)88-335-332-85-138(249-171(296)118(232-191(139)316)40-27-31-58-208)189(314)230-116(38-25-29-56-206)167(292)217-78-149(276)227-131(70-154(283)284)174(299)224-99(11)203(328)261-59-32-41-144(261)195(320)243-133(72-156(287)288)181(306)237-122(61-93(2)3)175(300)246-136(83-264)187(312)240-127(66-109-74-212-91-220-109)180(305)234-121(54-60-331-17)173(298)258-160(101(13)266)197(322)219-80-151(278)255-161(102(14)267)202(327)257-159(95(6)7)199(324)244-124(63-106-42-46-111(270)47-43-106)176(301)238-123(62-105-33-20-19-21-34-105)177(302)247-137(84-265)188(313)253-140/h19-23,33-36,42-49,73-75,91-104,115-144,157-163,214,262-271H,18,24-32,37-41,50-72,76-90,205-208,211H2,1-17H3,(H2,209,272)(H2,210,273)(H,212,220)(H,213,221)(H,215,274)(H,216,291)(H,217,292)(H,218,293)(H,219,322)(H,222,323)(H,223,325)(H,224,299)(H,225,294)(H,226,275)(H,227,276)(H,228,277)(H,229,315)(H,230,314)(H,231,311)(H,232,316)(H,233,304)(H,234,305)(H,235,321)(H,236,289)(H,237,306)(H,238,301)(H,239,310)(H,240,312)(H,241,317)(H,242,318)(H,243,320)(H,244,324)(H,245,326)(H,246,300)(H,247,302)(H,248,303)(H,249,296)(H,250,295)(H,251,297)(H,252,307)(H,253,313)(H,254,319)(H,255,278)(H,256,290)(H,257,327)(H,258,298)(H,259,308)(H,260,309)(H,279,280)(H,281,282)(H,283,284)(H,285,286)(H,287,288)(H,329,330)/t96-,97-,98-,99-,100-,101+,102+,103+,104+,115-,116-,117-,118-,119-,120-,121-,122-,123-,124-,125-,126-,127-,128-,129-,130-,131-,132-,133-,134-,135-,136-,137-,138-,139-,140-,141-,142-,143-,144-,157-,158-,159-,160-,161-,162-,163-/m0/s1 Key: GDXGDKLGJJKIHD-BRLSVDHBSA-N
- SMILES: N[C@@]([H])([C@]([H])(CC)C)C(=O)N[C@@]([H])(CCC(=O)O)C(=O)N[C@@]([H])(CS3)C(=O)N[C@@]([H])(CCCCN)C(=O)N[C@@]([H])(CS4)C(=O)N[C@@]([H])(CCC(=O)O)C(=O)NCC(=O)N[C@@]([H])(CC(=O)O)C(=O)N[C@@]([H])(C)C(=O)N1[C@@]([H])(CCC1)C(=O)N[C@@]([H])(CC(=O)O)C(=O)N[C@@]([H])(CC(C)C)C(=O)N[C@@]([H])(CO)C(=O)N[C@@]([H])(CC1=CN=C-N1)C(=O)N[C@@]([H])(CCSC)C(=O)N[C@@]([H])([C@]([H])(O)C)C(=O)NCC(=O)N[C@@]([H])([C@]([H])(O)C)C(=O)N[C@@]([H])(C(C)C)C(=O)N[C@@]([H])(Cc1ccc(O)cc1)C(=O)N[C@@]([H])(Cc1ccccc1)C(=O)N[C@@]([H])(CO)C(=O)N[C@@]([H])(CS5)C(=O)N[C@@]([H])(CCCCN)C(=O)NCC(=O)NCC(=O)N[C@@]([H])(CC(=O)O)C(=O)NCC(=O)N[C@@]([H])(CO)C(=O)N[C@@]([H])(CC(=CN2)C1=C2C=CC=C1)C(=O)N[C@@]([H])(CO)C(=O)N[C@@]([H])(CCCCN)C(=O)N[C@@]([H])(CS4)C(=O)N[C@@]([H])(CC(=O)N)C(=O)N[C@@]([H])([C@]([H])(O)C)C(=O)N[C@@]([H])(Cc1ccc(O)cc1)C(=O)N[C@@]([H])([C@]([H])(O)C)C(=O)N[C@@]([H])(C)C(=O)N[C@@]([H])(C(C)C)C(=O)N[C@@]([H])(C)C(=O)N[C@@]([H])(CC(=O)O)C(=O)N[C@@]([H])(CS3)C(=O)N[C@@]([H])(CS5)C(=O)N[C@@]([H])(CC1=CN=C-N1)C(=O)N[C@@]([H])(CCC(=O)N)C(=O)N[C@@]([H])(C)C(=O)O; N[C@@]([H])([C@]([H])(CC)C)C(=O)N[C@@]([H])(CCC(=O)O)C(=O)N[C@@]([H])(CS3)C(=O)N[C@@]([H])(CCCCN)C(=O)N[C@@]([H])(CS4)C(=O)N[C@@]([H])(CCCCN)C(=O)NCC(=O)N[C@@]([H])(CC(=O)O)C(=O)N[C@@]([H])(C)C(=O)N1[C@@]([H])(CCC1)C(=O)N[C@@]([H])(CC(=O)O)C(=O)N[C@@]([H])(CC(C)C)C(=O)N[C@@]([H])(CO)C(=O)N[C@@]([H])(CC1=CN=C-N1)C(=O)N[C@@]([H])(CCSC)C(=O)N[C@@]([H])([C@]([H])(O)C)C(=O)NCC(=O)N[C@@]([H])([C@]([H])(O)C)C(=O)N[C@@]([H])(C(C)C)C(=O)N[C@@]([H])(Cc1ccc(O)cc1)C(=O)N[C@@]([H])(Cc1ccccc1)C(=O)N[C@@]([H])(CO)C(=O)N[C@@]([H])(CS5)C(=O)N[C@@]([H])(CCCCN)C(=O)NCC(=O)NCC(=O)N[C@@]([H])(CC(=O)O)C(=O)NCC(=O)N[C@@]([H])(CO)C(=O)N[C@@]([H])(CC(=CN2)C1=C2C=CC=C1)C(=O)N[C@@]([H])(CO)C(=O)N[C@@]([H])(CCCCN)C(=O)N[C@@]([H])(CS4)C(=O)N[C@@]([H])(CC(=O)N)C(=O)N[C@@]([H])([C@]([H])(O)C)C(=O)N[C@@]([H])(Cc1ccc(O)cc1)C(=O)N[C@@]([H])([C@]([H])(O)C)C(=O)N[C@@]([H])(C)C(=O)N[C@@]([H])(C(C)C)C(=O)N[C@@]([H])(C)C(=O)N[C@@]([H])(CC(=O)O)C(=O)N[C@@]([H])(CS3)C(=O)N[C@@]([H])(CS5)C(=O)N[C@@]([H])(CC1=CN=C-N1)C(=O)N[C@@]([H])(CCC(=O)N)C(=O)N[C@@]([H])(C)C(=O)O
- Except where otherwise noted, data are given for materials in their standard state (at 25 °C [77 °F], 100 kPa). Infobox references

Calitoxin-1

Identifiers
- Organism: Calliactis parasitica
- Symbol: CLX-1
- Orthologs: OMA: entry
- UniProt: P14531
Search for
- Structures: Swiss-model
- Domains: InterPro

Calitoxin-2

Identifiers
- Organism: Calliactis parasitica
- Symbol: CLX-2
- Orthologs: OMA: entry
- UniProt: P49127
Search for
- Structures: Swiss-model
- Domains: InterPro

Identifiers
- Symbol: Toxin_4
- Pfam: PF00706
- InterPro: IPR000693
Available protein structures:
- PDB: IPR000693 PF00706 (ECOD; PDBsum)
- AlphaFold: IPR000693; PF00706

Calitoxin, also known as CLX, is a sea anemone neurotoxin produced by the sea anemone Calliactis parasitica. It targets crabs and octopuses, among other invertebrates. Two isoforms (CLX-1 and CLX-2) have been identified, both of which are formed from precursors stored in the stinging cells of the anemone. Once the toxin is activated and released, it causes paralysis by increasing neurotransmitter release at invertebrate neuromuscular junctions. Along with several other toxins derived from anemones, CLX is useful in ion channel research. Certain structural aspects of calitoxin are dissimilar from sea anemone toxins that also target the sodium ion channels. Other toxins resembling calitoxin function in completely different ways.

== Source and discovery ==
Calitoxin is a highly potent neurotoxin produced by the sea anemone Calliactis parasitica, which is stored in the nematocysts of stinging cells (cnidocytes). This sea anemone is a species from the Hormathiidae family and is present along the European coasts of the Atlantic Ocean and in the Mediterranean Sea. The name calitoxin is derived from the organism from which the toxin was isolated. The toxin was isolated by a team of researchers in Naples, Italy from animals collected in the Bay of Naples. The team isolated the polypeptide through a series of centrifugations until the supernatant had lost toxic activity. The resulting pellet was purified using the techniques liquid chromatography, gel filtration, and chromatofocusing. The team then sequenced the purified polypeptide chain. They also published details on the toxin's effects in vitro on crustacean tissue preparations, including nerve and muscle. Their findings were published in the journal Biochemistry in 1989.

== Structure and chemistry ==
It has an isoelectric point at pH 5.4. The amino acid sequence is markedly dissimilar from other known sea anemones toxins. There are two known genes coding for two highly homologous calitoxins: CLX-1 and CLX-2. Both originate from a precursor peptide of 79 amino acids where the C-terminus determines whether it will be the mature CLX-1 or CLX-2. The activated toxins consist of 46 amino acids with three disulfide bonds. Researchers suspect that the toxins are stored as precursors in cnidocytes. Under the effects of some triggering stimulus, the precursor is modified and released in the active form. The patterning of cleavage sites targeted during maturation of the peptide suggest that the active quaternary structure might be a tetrapeptide.

Amino acid sequences of CLX precursors
| Isoform | Sequence | Disulfide bridge locations |
|---|---|---|
| CLX-1 precursor | MKTQVLALFV LCVLFCLAES RTTLNKRNDI EKRIECKCEG DAPDLSHMTG TVYFSCKGGD GSWSKCNTYT AVADCCHQA | 36 – 75; 38 – 66; 56 – 76 |
| CLX-2 precursor | MKTQVLAVFV LCVLFCLAES RTTLNKRIDI AKRIECKCKG DAPDLSHMTG TVYFSCKGGD GSWSKCNTYT AVADCCHQA | 36 – 75; 38 – 66; 56 – 76 |

Calitoxin and other sea anemone toxins are used in studying ion channels, with potential applications in biomedical and physiology research. In the mature CLX, one base-pair substitution is responsible for a single glutamic acid to lysine replacement in the coding region of CLX-2, leading to the difference between the two isoforms. The structural organization of these two genes show a high degree of homology. This suggests that the two different peptides have the same biological function. This cannot yet be confirmed because only CLX-1 has been isolated from C. parasitica. Calitoxin has a very different sequence from another sodium channel binding sea anemone toxin, ATX-II, which is produced by the distantly related Anemonia sulcata. A better understanding of these differences might offer insights about the function of particular amino acid residues. Despite markedly dissimilar gene sequences, CLX-1 affects crustacean axon potentials similar to two other classes of anemone toxins. Alternatively, certain aspects of the structure of the CLX genes are found in scorpion toxins as well as other sea anemone toxins that block potassium channels.

== Target and activity ==
Calitoxin causes massive neurotransmitter release from the nerve terminals of the neuromuscular junction, which in turn causes a strong muscle contraction and even paralysis. The exact target of calitoxin has not yet been clarified; since it has a similar action on the neuromuscular junction as Anemonia sulcata toxins, calitoxin may slow down the inactivation of voltage-gated sodium channels in motor neurons. Calitoxin has been tested for activity on the crab Carcinus mediterraneus. Purified toxin was injected into the hemocoel of the crab. The minimum dose of 0.2 μg of toxin triggered muscle contractions in the crab, causing paralysis within 1 minute. The median lethal dose (LD_{50}) is unknown.

== Function in nature ==
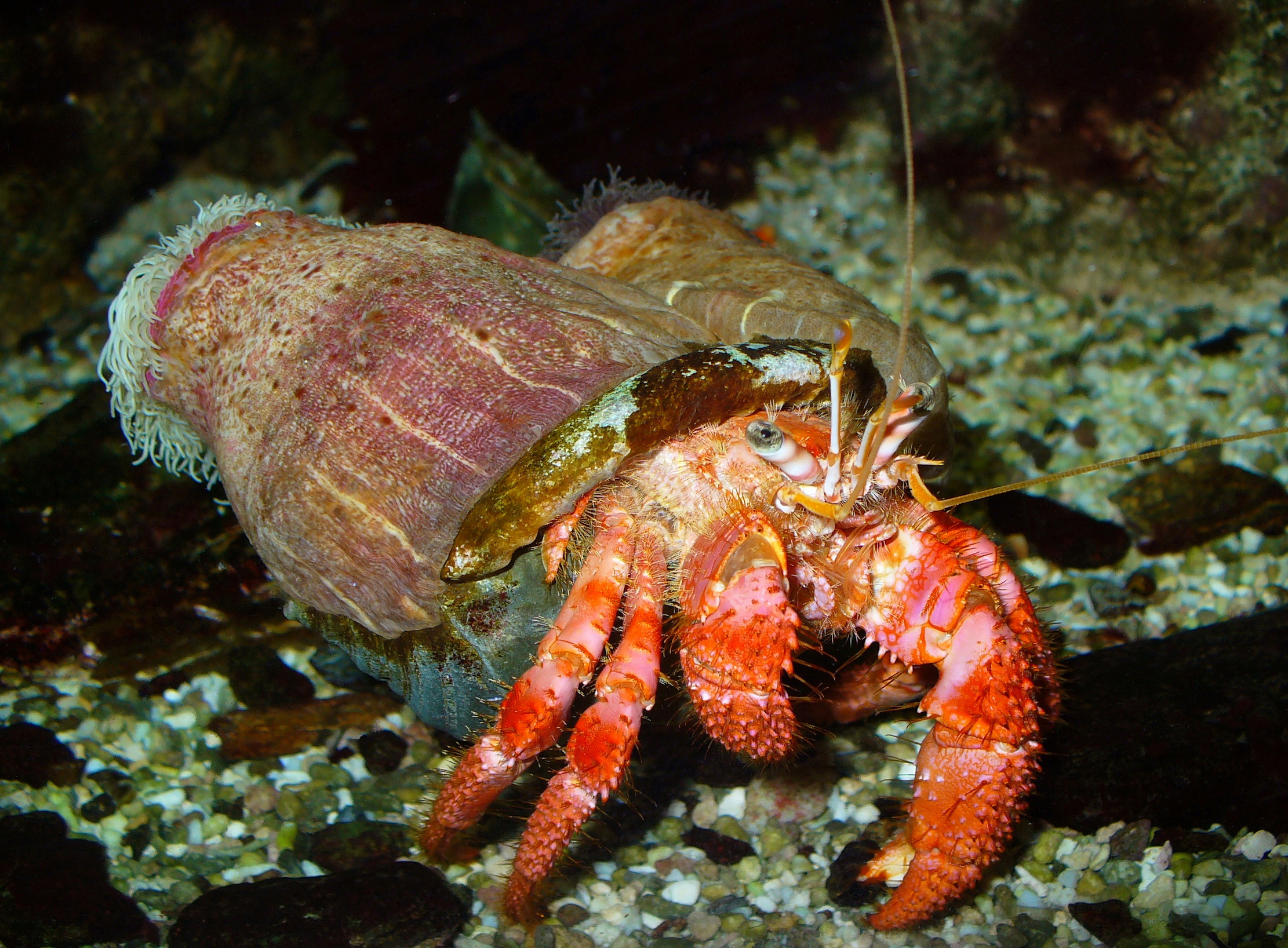
Calliactis parasitica with a symbiotic hermit crab

Sea anemones produce toxins, such as calitoxin, in their stinging cells (cnidocytes). These cells contain organelles called nematocysts. When triggered, an envenomation response occurs. This can result in injury to target organisms, including capture of prey, defense against predatory organisms, or against aggressors from within their own species. In its natural setting, C. parasitica can establish a mutualistic relationship with the hermit crab Pagurus bernhardus. The sea anemone identifies shells inhabited by the hermit crab and attaches. C. parasitica provides protection for the hermit crab, by stinging or intimidating potential predators. Octopuses will avoid shells bearing C. parasitica. In return for the protection, the sea anemone gains an advantage in accessing a broader distribution of food sources, as the crab moves across the ocean floor.
