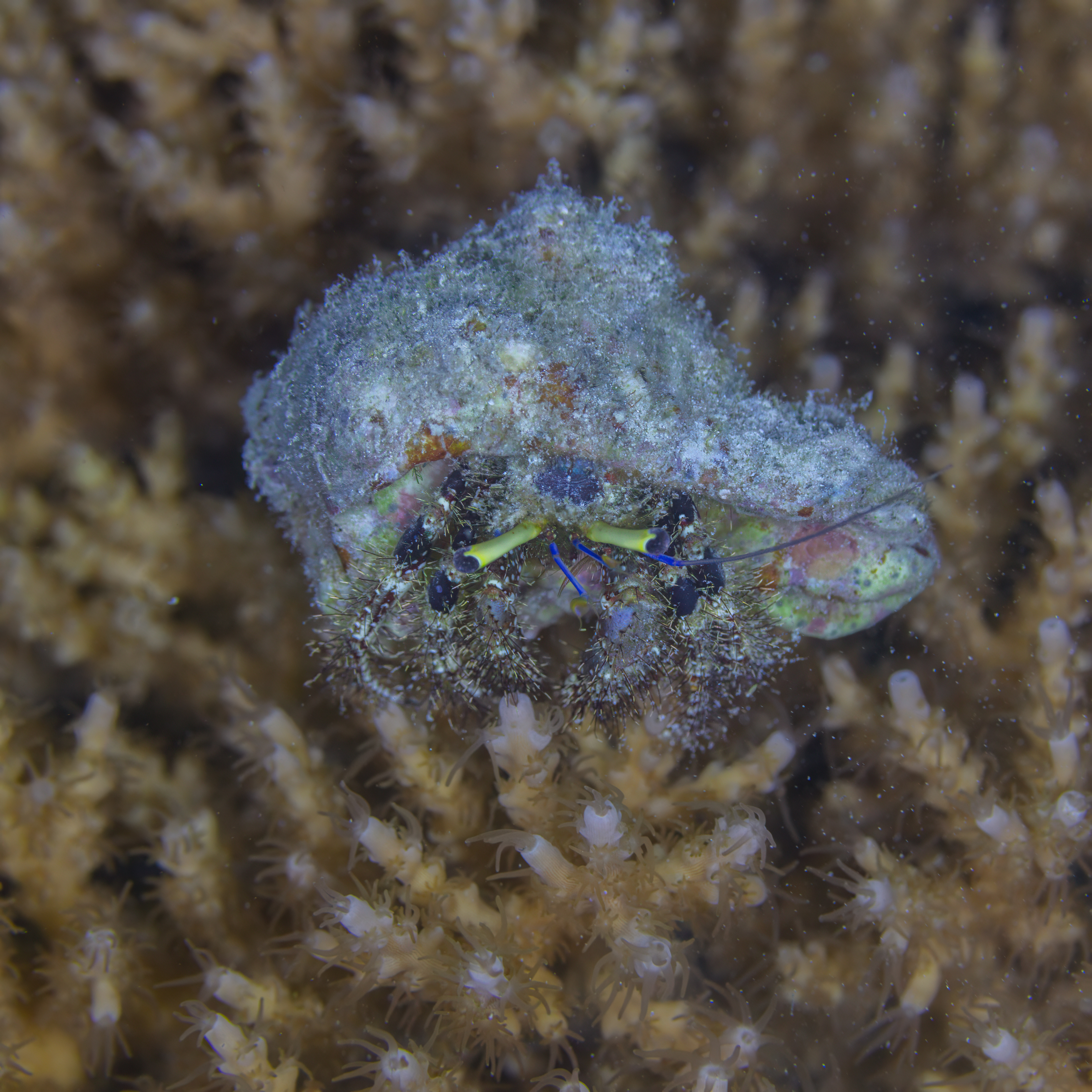

Scientific classification
- Kingdom: Animalia
- Phylum: Arthropoda
- Clade: Pancrustacea
- Class: Malacostraca
- Order: Decapoda
- Suborder: Pleocyemata
- Infraorder: Anomura
- Family: Diogenidae
- Genus: Dardanus
- Species: D. lagopodes

Binomial name
- Dardanus lagopodes (Forskål, 1775)

= Dardanus lagopodes =

Species of crustacean

Dardanus lagopodes, known commonly as the hairy red hermit crab, is a species of marine decapod crustacean in the family Diogenidae. Dardanus lagopodes is widespread throughout the tropical waters of the Indo-West Pacific region, including the Red Sea. It reaches a length of 10 centimetres (3.9 in).
