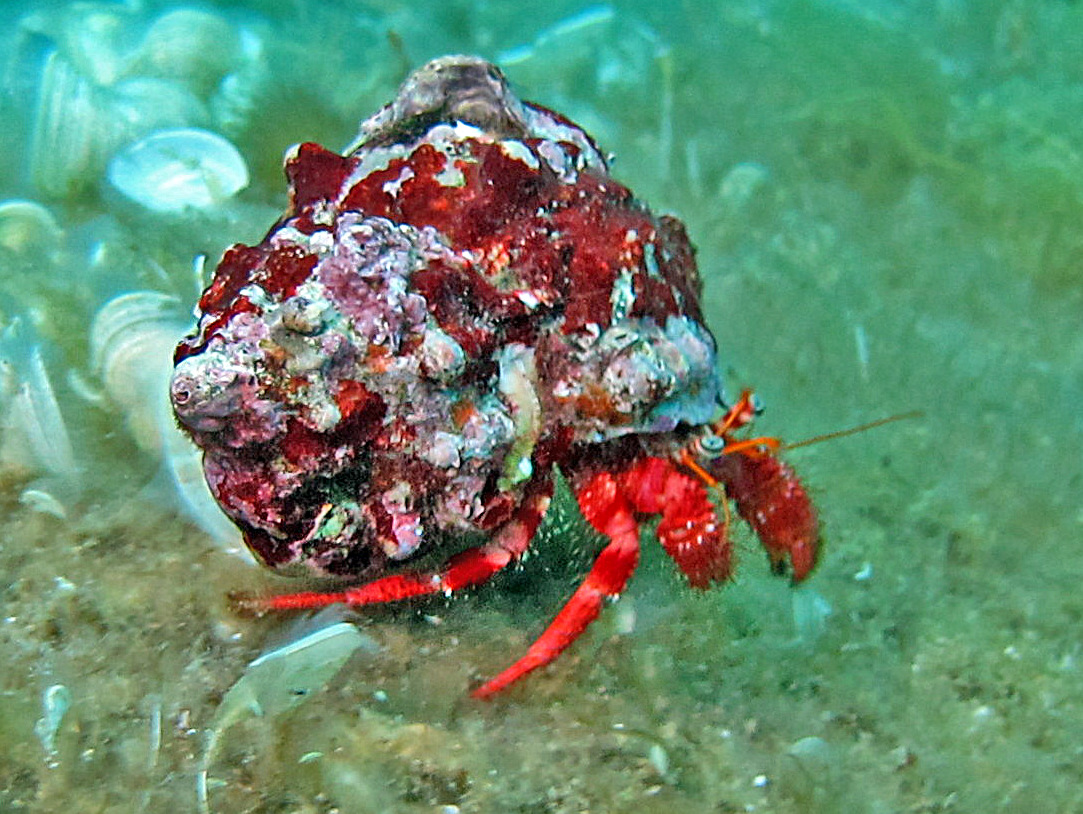
- Dardanus arrosor from Elba

Scientific classification
- Kingdom: Animalia
- Phylum: Arthropoda
- Class: Malacostraca
- Order: Decapoda
- Suborder: Pleocyemata
- Infraorder: Anomura
- Family: Diogenidae
- Genus: Dardanus
- Species: D. arrosor

Binomial name
- Dardanus arrosor (Herbst, 1796)

Synonyms
- Aniculus chiltoni Thompson, 1930; Cancer arrosor Herbst, 1796; Eupagurus striatus Cuenot, 1892; Pagurus incisus Olivier, 1812; Pagurus striatus Latreille, 1802; Pagurus strigosus Bosc, 1802; Petrochirus arrosorHerbst, 1796)

= Dardanus arrosor =

Species of crustacean

Dardanus arrosor, the red reef hermit or Mediterranean hermit crab, is a species of hermit crab.

== Description ==
Carapace of Dardanus arrosor can reach a length of 6–8 centimetres (2.4–3.1 in). The color varies from bright red to bright orange. The eyestalks are robust, not very long, dilated at the tip and alternately streaked with red and white. The eyes are bluish. Claws show hair-like spines and warty tubercles. The left claw is more developed than the right one, but in both claws the tip is black or yellowish. The abdomen is asymmetrical, bare and hidden within a shell.

== Biology ==
This species breed between July and August. These crabs show the striking behavior of living within empty shells of conches (usually shells of Bittium latreillii), often decorated with sea anemones (usually Calliactis parasitica). The larvae have a symmetrical shape, but gradually they develop an asymmetrical abdomen that this crustacean will hide in a periodically replaced shell.

The relationship with the anemone is truly symbiotic, since the anemone gains scraps of food from the hermit crab, while the crab benefits from the anemone's stinging tentacles deterring predators.

This crab is an opportunistic scavenger and predator. It feeds on decaying matter, on live crabs and small fishes.

== Distribution ==
This widespread species can be found in the Atlantic coasts, in the Mediterranean Sea, in the Red Sea, in the Indo-West Pacific (Japan, New Zealand and Philippines).

== Habitat ==
This species inhabits continental shelf and slope. It usually lives on sandy substrate, on coastal detritic bottoms and on bathyal muds, from a few meters up to depths of 750 metres (2,460 ft).
