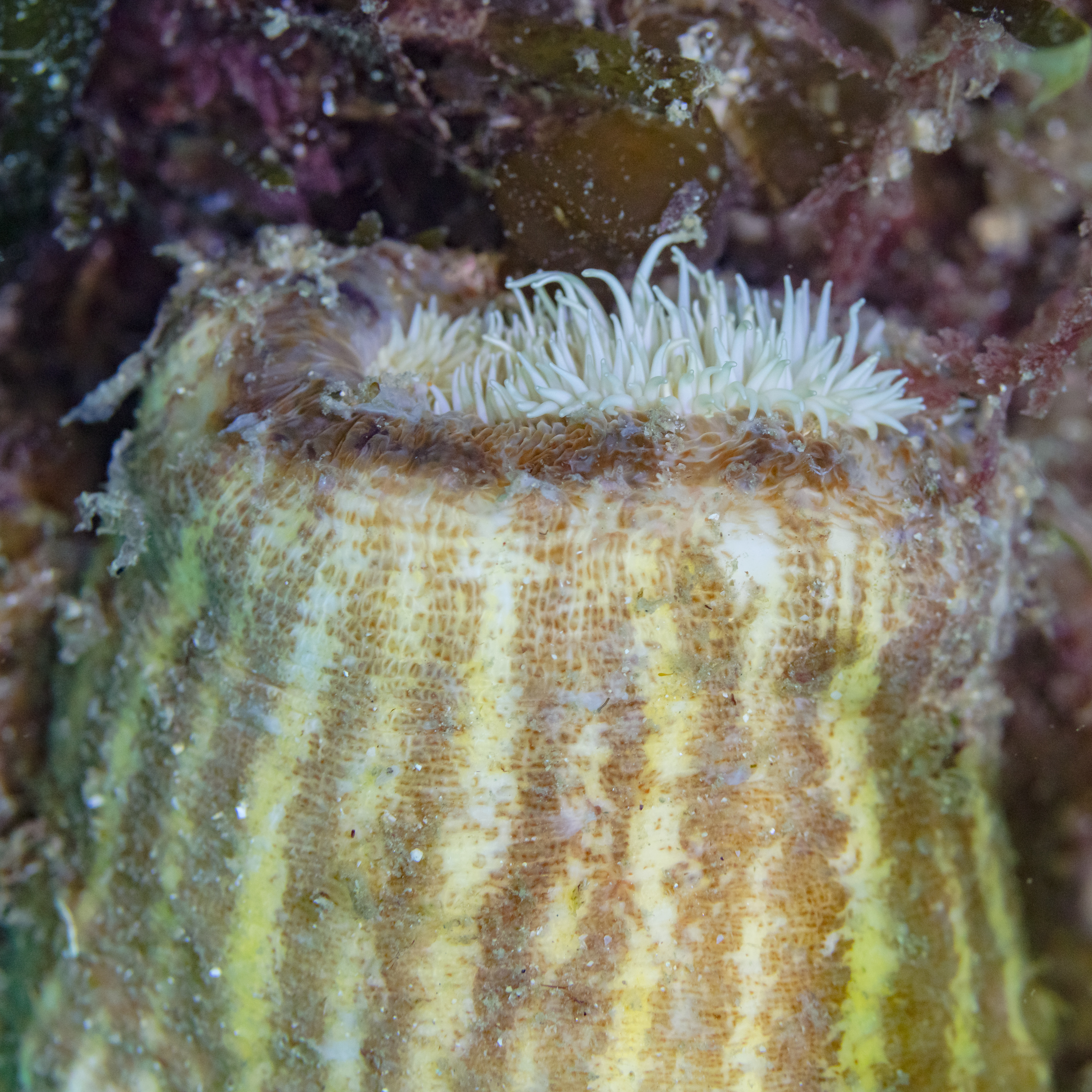

Conservation status
- Least Concern (IUCN 3.1) (Mediterranean)

Scientific classification
- Kingdom: Animalia
- Phylum: Cnidaria
- Subphylum: Anthozoa
- Class: Hexacorallia
- Order: Actiniaria
- Family: Hormathiidae
- Genus: Calliactis
- Species: C. parasitica

Binomial name
- Calliactis parasitica (Couch, 1844)

Synonyms
- List: Actinea parasitica; Actinia effeta; Actinia effoeta Linnaeus, 1767; Actinia parasitica Couch, 1842; Actinia priapus; Actinia rondeletii Delle Chiaje, 1828; Adamsia effta; Adamsia priapus; Calliactis effoeta; Calliactis effta Linnaeus; Calliactis polypus Klunzinger; Calliactis rondeletii (Delle Chiaje, 1828); Calliactus parasitica; Cribrina effoeta Ehrenberg; Cylista parasitica (Couch, 1842); Sagartia effaeta Linnaeus; Sagartia parasitica (Couch, 1842)

= Calliactis parasitica =

Species of sea anemone

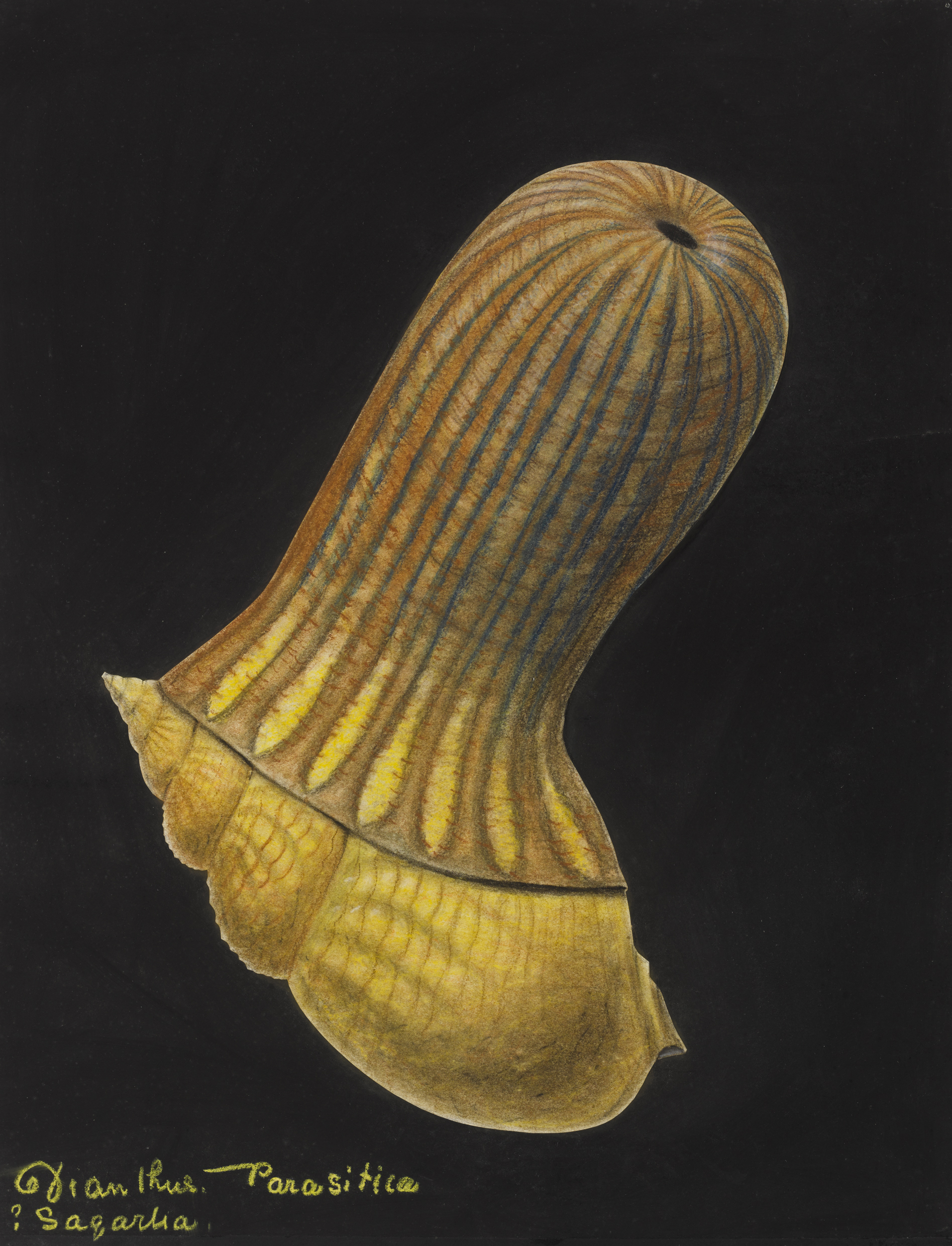
Paper collage on paper painted black of a Calliactis parasitica: parasitic anemone by Phillip Henry Gosse

Calliactis parasitica is a species of sea anemone associated with hermit crabs. It lives in the eastern Atlantic Ocean and Mediterranean Sea at depths between the intertidal zone and 60 m (200 ft). It is up to 10 cm × 8 cm (3.9 in × 3.1 in) in size, with up to 700 tentacles, and is very variable in colour. The relationship between C. parasitica and the hermit crab is mutualistic: the sea anemone protects the hermit crab with its stings, and benefits from the food thrown up by the hermit crab's movements.

== Description ==
Calliactis parasitica is up to 100 millimetres (3.9 in) tall, and 80 mm (3.1 in) wide, with the base of the column being slightly wider. The surface of the column is rough and leathery with a grainy appearance, but has no tubercles and is not divided into sections. It is variable in colouring, but is usually cream or buff in colour, with blotches and streaks of reddish or greyish brown, which tend to form vertical stripes.

The basal disc is concave, and able to stick firmly to the substrate. Above this lies the limbus (the junction between the basal disc and the column), and just above that are the relatively prominent cinclides (specialised pores), each on a small mound. These readily emit threadlike acontia (stings) when the animal is disturbed. At the top of the column are up to 700 slender tentacles of moderate length. They are translucent, and yellowish to orange in colour, with longitudinal lines of reddish brown.

== Distribution ==
Calliactis parasitica is found in the north-eastern Atlantic Ocean and the Mediterranean Sea. Its Atlantic range extends from south-western Europe as far north as the west coasts of Wales and Ireland, and the English Channel. Although this species has been recorded from the southern North Sea, those records are considered dubious. The depth distribution of C. parasitica ranges from a depth of 60 metres (200 ft) to the sublittoral zone; it is rarely found in the littoral zone.

== Ecology ==
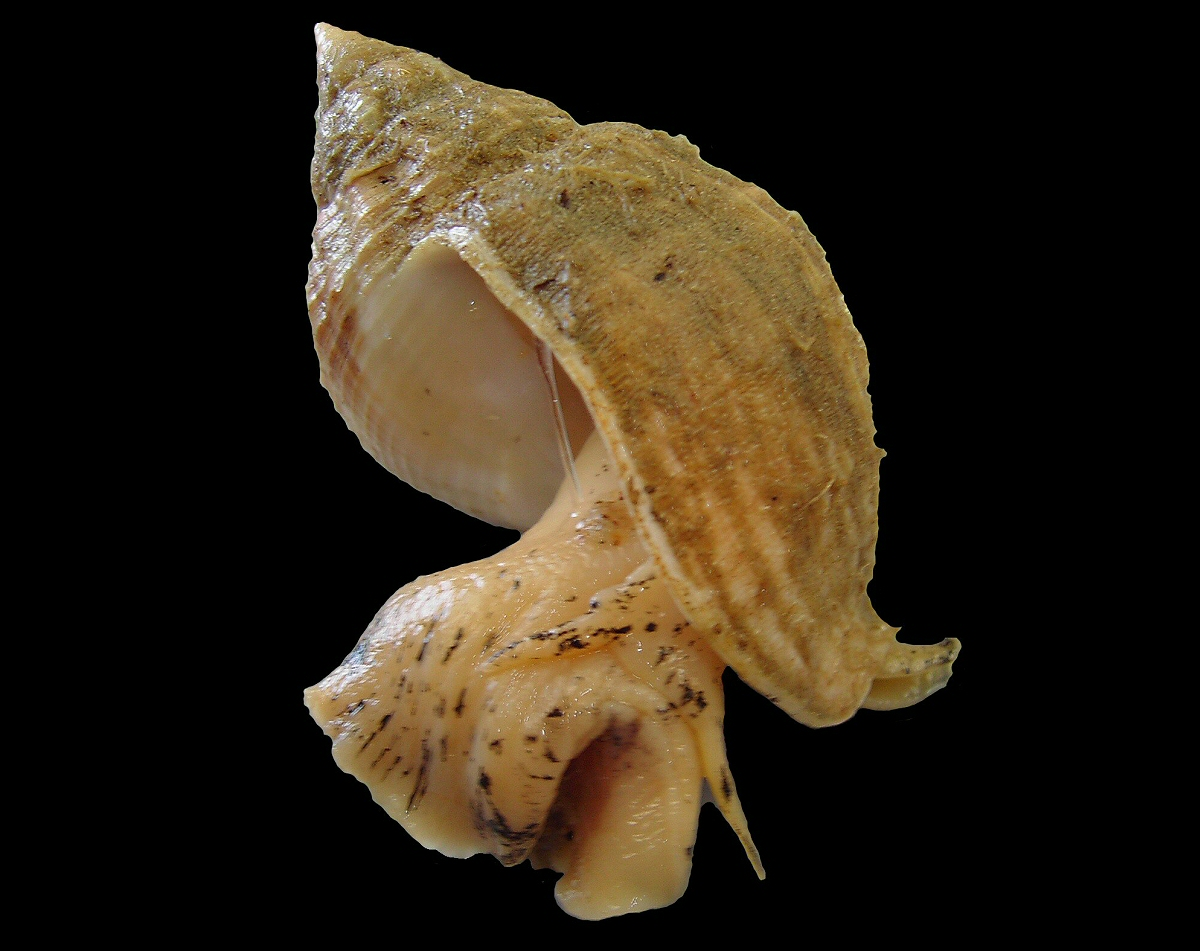
The shell of the sea snail Buccinum undatum (here shown live) is favoured by C. parasitic when the empty shell is pagurized (inhabited by a hermit crab)

Although Calliactis parasitica will occasionally attach to stones or empty shells, it is typically found on a gastropod shell inhabited by a hermit crab, and several individuals may live on the same shell. In the British Isles, the hermit crab is usually Pagurus bernhardus, but other species may be associated with C. parasitica in other parts of its range. C. parasitica is thought to use a chemical signal to detect its favoured shell, that of the whelk Buccinum undatum, because it has been observed in aquaria to mount the shell of a living B. undatum, although the whelk ensures that the sea anemone does not remain there.

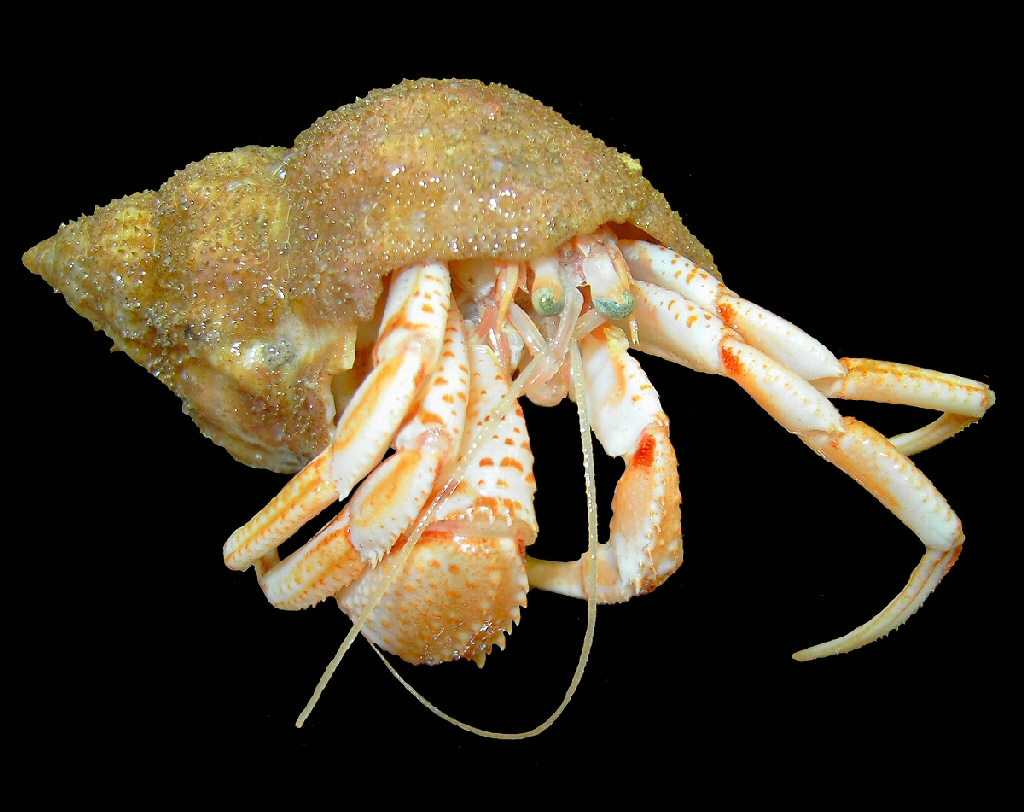
The hermit crab Pagurus bernhardus is a common symbiont of C. parasitica

Calliactis parasitica can survive without the hermit crab, and the hermit crab can survive without C. parasitica, but they associate with each other to their mutual benefit; this is known as mutualism. The hermit crab gains protection from predators by the sea anemone's stinging, and the sea anemone gains an increase in food from the material thrown up by the hermit crab's movements. The relationship is apparently instigated by the sea anemone, which begins a complex series of manoeuvres in order to mount the shell carried by the hermit crab; the hermit crab remains passive while these manoeuvres take place.

Octopuses will avoid shells bearing C. parasitica, but will persist in attacking shells containing the hermit crab Pagurus prideaux and bearing the sea anemone Adamsia palliata. In aquarium settings, the mutualism between C. parasitica and the hermit crab Dardanus arrosor can break down; this breakdown is prevented or reversed when chemical signals from octopuses are present. The presence of cephalopods may therefore be necessary for the relationship between the hermit crab and the anemone to be maintained.

== Taxonomy ==
Calliactis parasitica was first described under the name Actinia parisitica, in the Cornish Fauna. This work was begun by Jonathan Couch, but the third volume, in which C. parasitica was described, was written by his son, Richard Quiller Couch. Couch considered that his new species "may probably be considered a variety of the Actinia gemmacea [now Aulactinia verrucosa]", although his specimens "had not the appearance of belonging to that species".

== Toxin ==
Calitoxin (CLX), derives its name from the sea anemone Calliactis parasitica.
