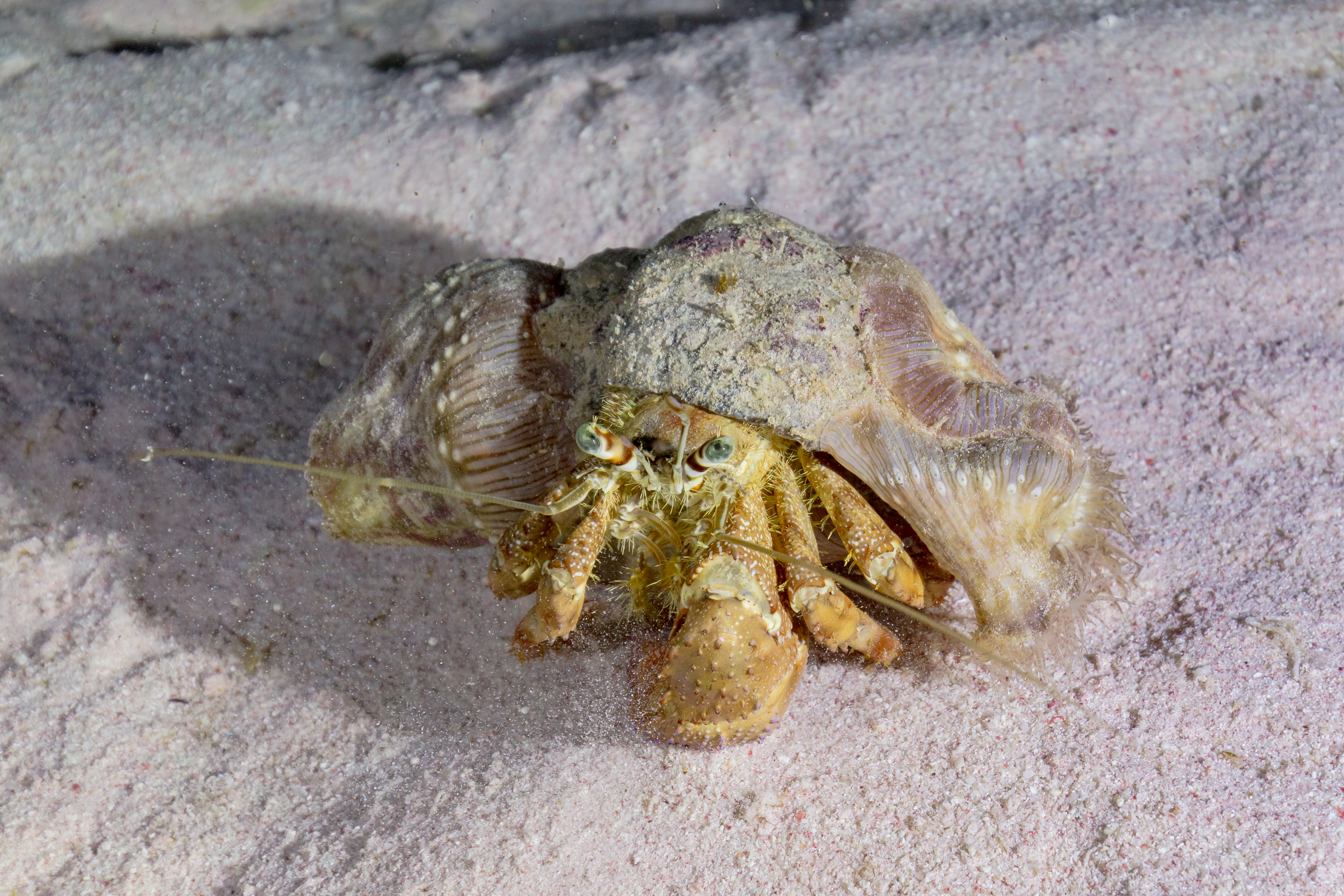

Scientific classification
- Domain: Eukaryota
- Kingdom: Animalia
- Phylum: Arthropoda
- Class: Malacostraca
- Order: Decapoda
- Suborder: Pleocyemata
- Infraorder: Anomura
- Family: Diogenidae
- Genus: Dardanus
- Species: D. gemmatus

Binomial name
- Dardanus gemmatus (H. Milne-Edwards, 1848)

Synonyms
- Pagurus gemmatus H. Milne-Edwards, 1848

= Dardanus gemmatus =

Species of crustacean

Dardanus gemmatus, the jeweled anemone hermit crab, is a species of hermit crab native to tropical reefs surrounding the Indo-Pacific, typically at depths of 2–100 metres (10–330 ft).
