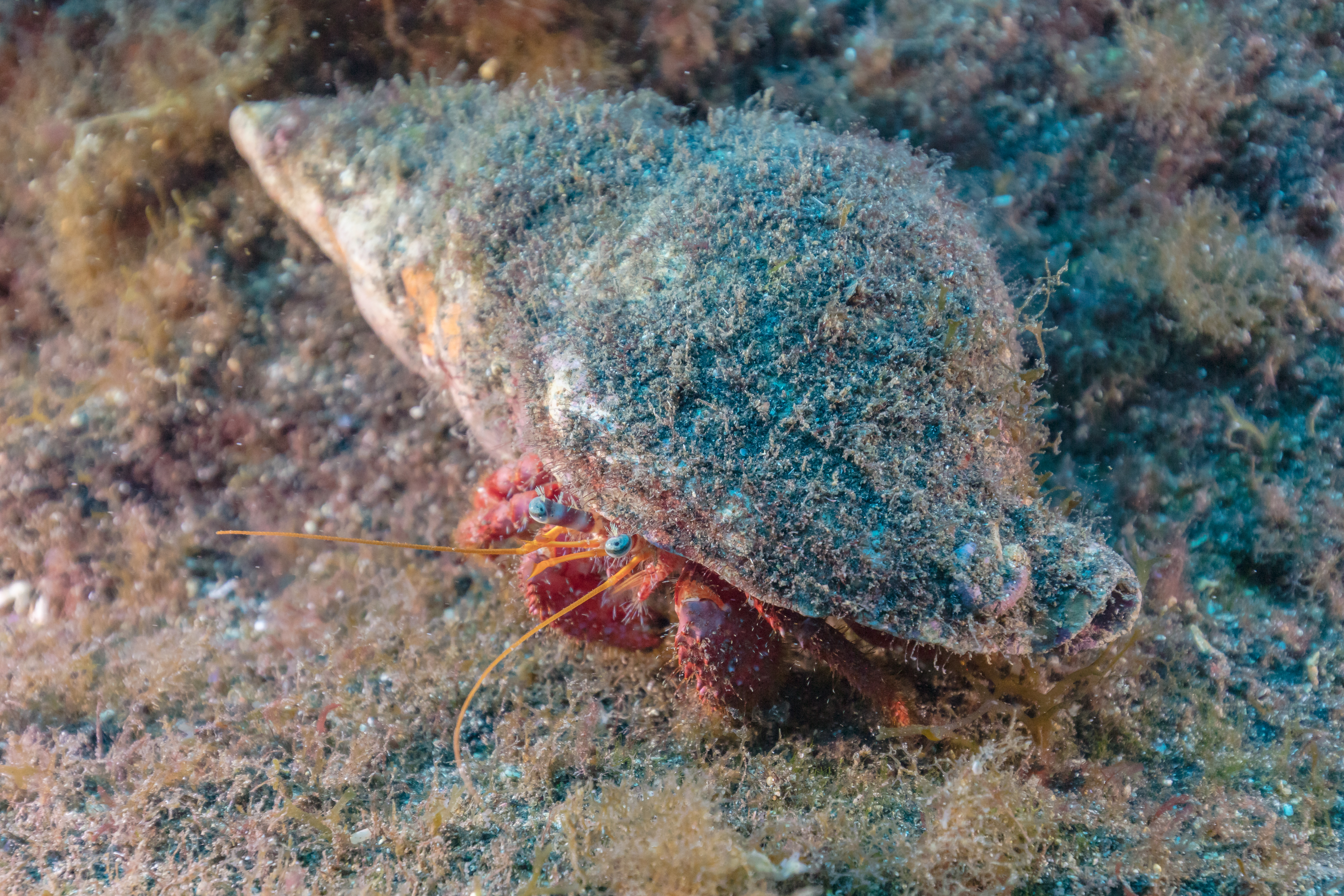
- Dardanus calidus

Scientific classification
- Kingdom: Animalia
- Phylum: Arthropoda
- Class: Malacostraca
- Order: Decapoda
- Suborder: Pleocyemata
- Infraorder: Anomura
- Family: Diogenidae
- Genus: Dardanus; Paulson, 1875

Species
- See text

= Dardanus (crustacean) =

Genus of crustaceans

Dardanus is a genus of hermit crabs belonging to the Diogenidae family.

== List of species ==
This genus contains the following species:

- †Dardanus agnoensis Bechin, Busulini & Tessier, 2022
- †Dardanus arnoldi Rathbun, 1926
- Dardanus arrosor (Herbst, 1796)
- Dardanus aspersus (Berthold, 1846)
- Dardanus australis Forest & Morgan, 1991
- †Dardanus balaitus Ferratges, Artal, Van Bakel & Zamora, 2022
- Dardanus balhibuon Malay, Rahayu & Chan, 2018
- †Dardanus bayani Beschin, Busulini, Tessier & Zorzin, 2016
- Dardanus biordines Collins & Todd in Todd & Collins, 2005
- Dardanus brachyops Forest, 1962
- †Dardanus braggensis Beschin, Busulini & Tessier, 2015
- Dardanus calidus (Risso, 1827)
- Dardanus callichela Cook, 1989
- †Dardanus caporiondoi Ceccon & De Angeli, 2019
- †Dardanus cherpionensis Marangon & De Angeli, 2020
- †Dardanus colosseus Fraaije & Polkowsky, 2016
- Dardanus corrugatus Cook, 1989
- Dardanus crassimanus (H. Milne Edwards, 1836)
- †Dardanus curtimanus Müller & Collins, 1991
- †Dardanus cyprioticus Wallaard, Fraaije, Van Bakel, Jagt & Müller, 2023
- Dardanus dearmatus (Henderson, 1888)
- Dardanus deformis (H. Milne Edwards, 1836)
- †Dardanus faxensis Jakobsen, Fraaije, Jagt & Van Bakel, 2020
- Dardanus fucosus Biffar & Provenzano, 1972
- Dardanus gemmatus (H. Milne Edwards, 1848)
- Dardanus guttatus (Olivier, 1812)
- Dardanus hessii (Miers, 1884)
- Dardanus holthuisi Rahayu, 2010
- †Dardanus hungaricus (Lőrenthey in Lőrenthey & Beurlen, 1929)
- Dardanus imbricatus (H. Milne Edwards, 1848)
- Dardanus imperator (Miers, 1881)
- Dardanus impressus (De Haan, 1849)
- Dardanus insignis (de Saussure, 1857)
- Dardanus jacquesi Asakura & Hirayama, 2002
- Dardanus janethaigae Ayón Parente & Hendrickx, 2009
- Dardanus lagopodes (Forskål, 1775)
- †Dardanus lauensis Rathbun, 1945
- Dardanus longior Asakura, 2006
- Dardanus magdalenensis Ayón Parente & Hendrickx, 2009
- †Dardanus mediterraneus (Lőrenthey, 1907)
- Dardanus megistos (Herbst, 1804)
- †Dardanus muelleri Karasawa & Inoue, 1992
- Dardanus nudus Ayón Parente & Hendrickx, 2009
- Dardanus pectinatus (Ortmann, 1892)
- Dardanus pedunculatus (Herbst, 1804)
- Dardanus pilosus Ayón Parente & Hendrickx, 2009
- †Dardanus plevrotos Wallaard, Fraaije, Van Bakel, Jagt & Müller, 2023
- †Dardanus portmorantensis Collins & Donovan, 2010
- Dardanus robustus Asakura, 2006
- Dardanus rufus Buitendijk, 1937
- Dardanus sanguinocarpus Degener in Edmondson, 1925
- Dardanus sanguinolentus (Quoy & Gaimard, 1824)
- Dardanus scutellatus (H. Milne Edwards, 1848)
- Dardanus setifer (H. Milne Edwards, 1836)
- Dardanus sinistripes (Stimpson, 1859)
- †Dardanus squamatus Collins in Collins, Portell & Donovan, 2009
- Dardanus squarrosus Cook, 1989
- Dardanus stimpsoni Ayón Parente & Hendrickx, 2009
- †Dardanus substriatus (A. Milne-Edwards in Sismonda, 1861)
- †Dardanus suessi Beschin, Busulini, Tessier & Zorzin, 2016
- Dardanus sulcatus Edmondson, 1925
- Dardanus tinctor (Forskål, 1775)
- Dardanus umbella Asakura, 2006
- Dardanus undulatus (Balss, 1921)
- †Dardanus vandeneeckhauti Fraaije, Van Bakel, Iserbyt & Jagt, 2011
- Dardanus venosus (H. Milne Edwards, 1848)
- Dardanus vulnerans (Thallwitz, 1891)
- Dardanus woodmasoni (Alcock, 1905)
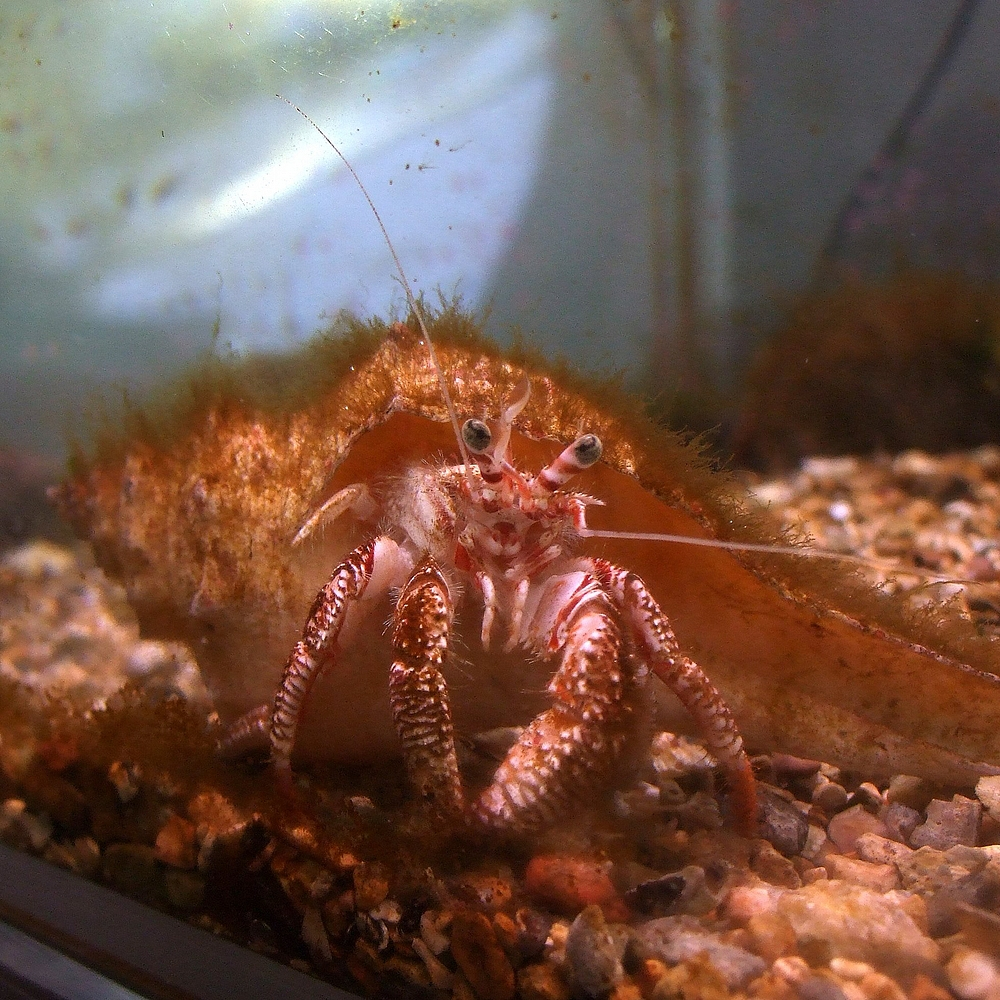
Dardanus arrosor

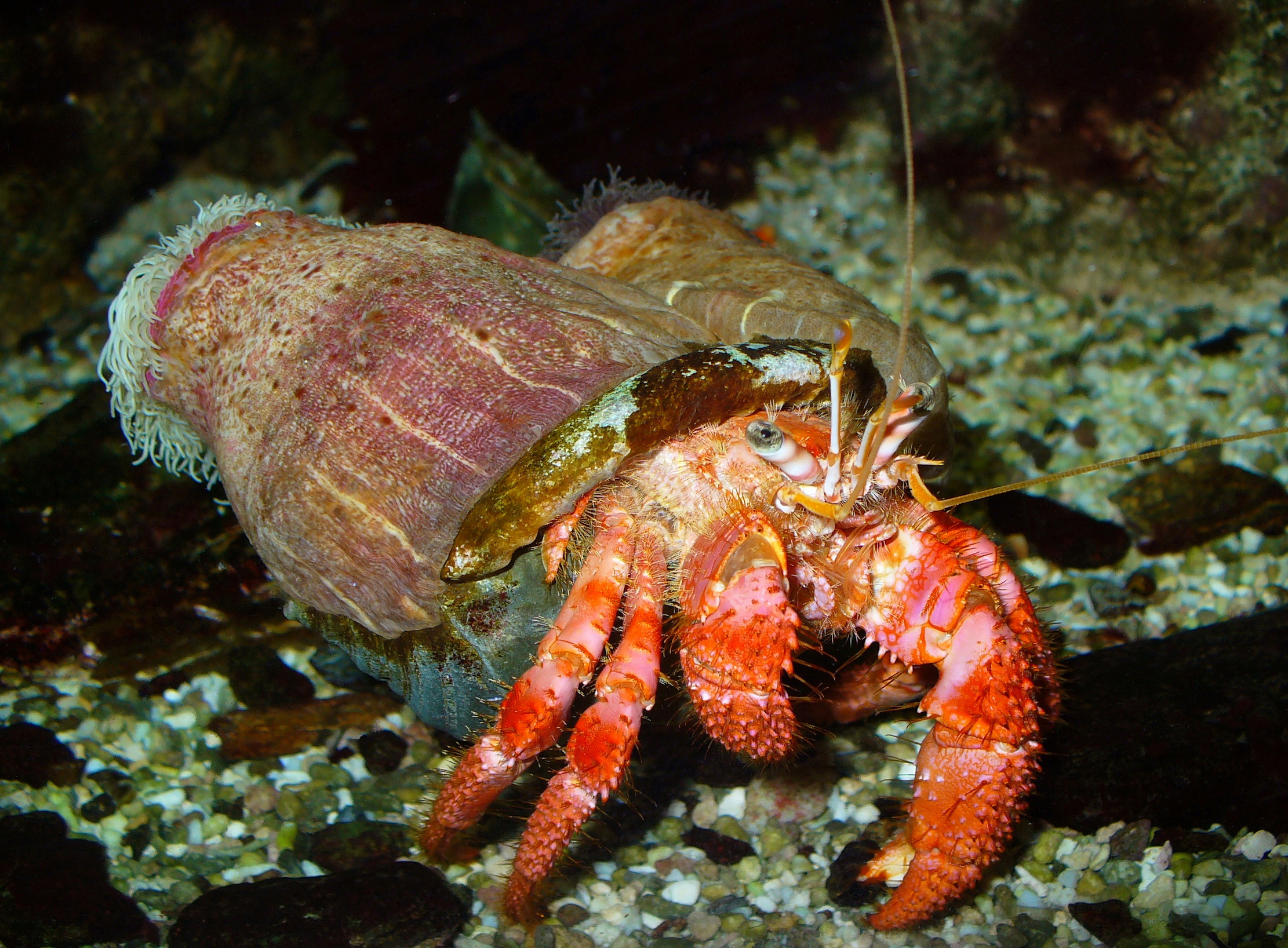
Dardanus calidus

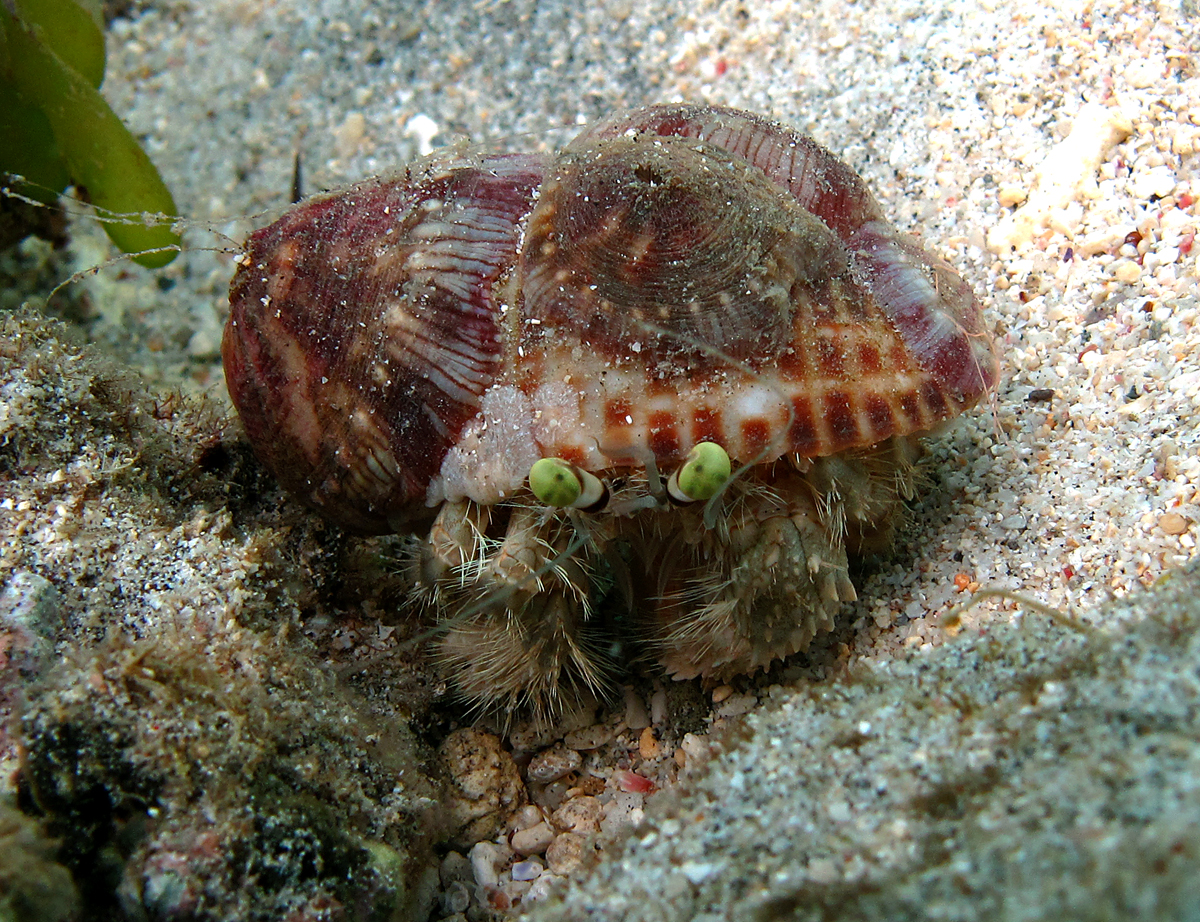
Dardanus deformis

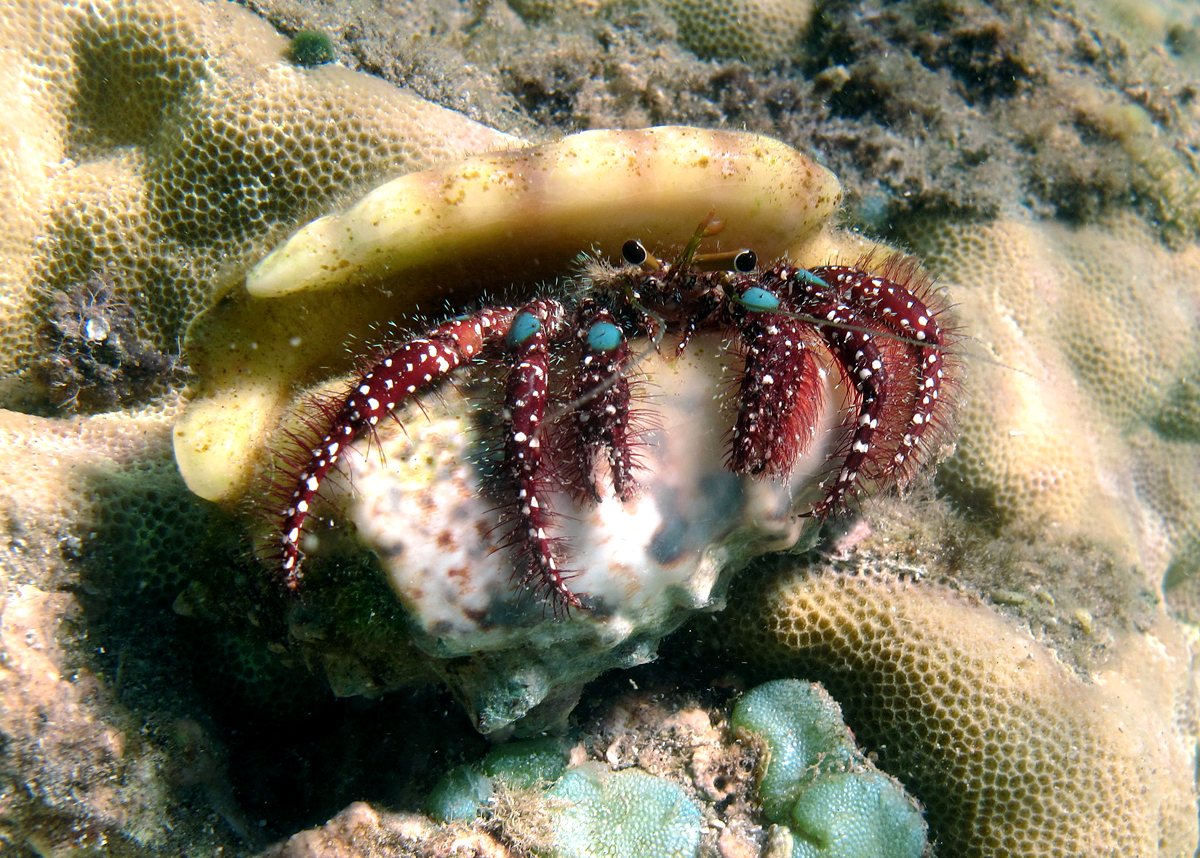
Dardanus guttatus

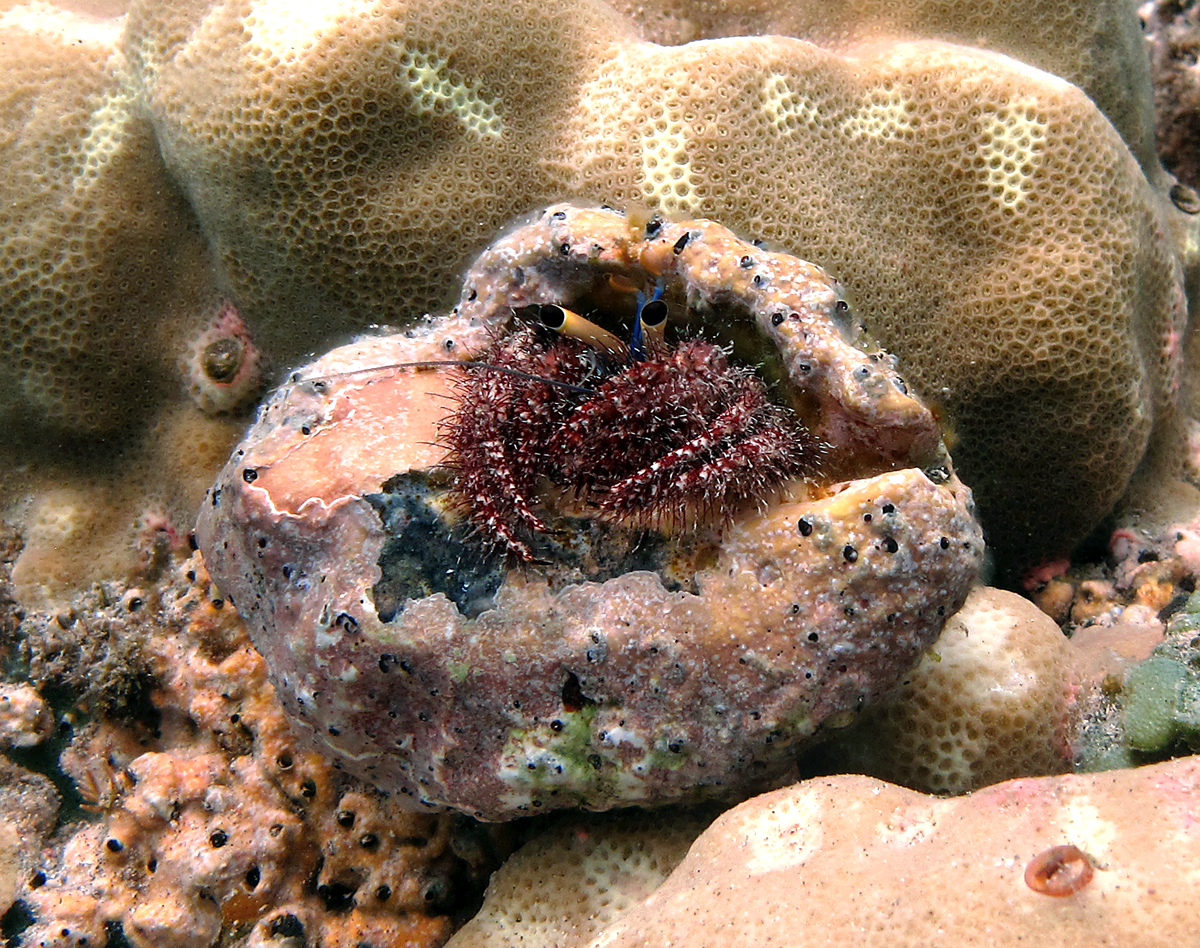
Dardanus lagopodes

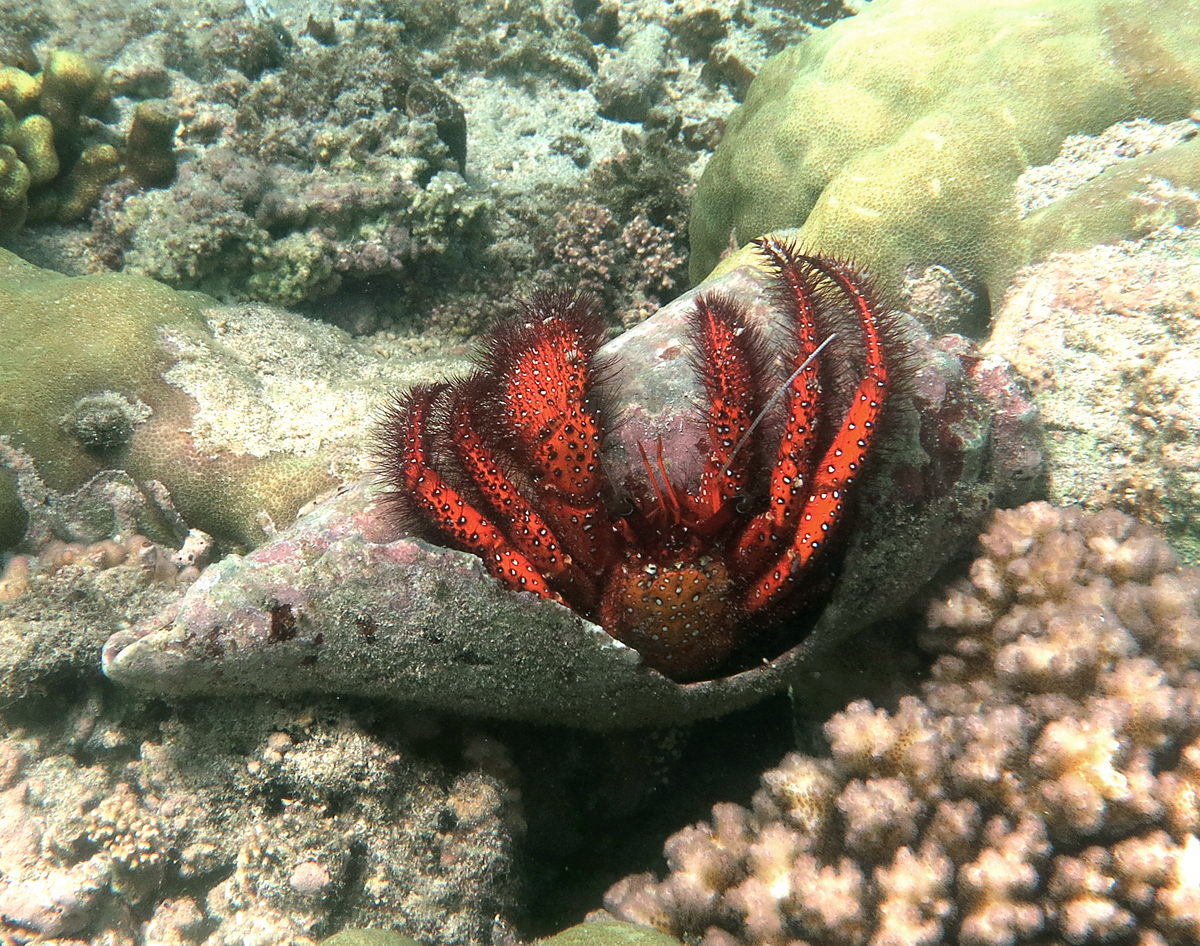
Dardanus megistos

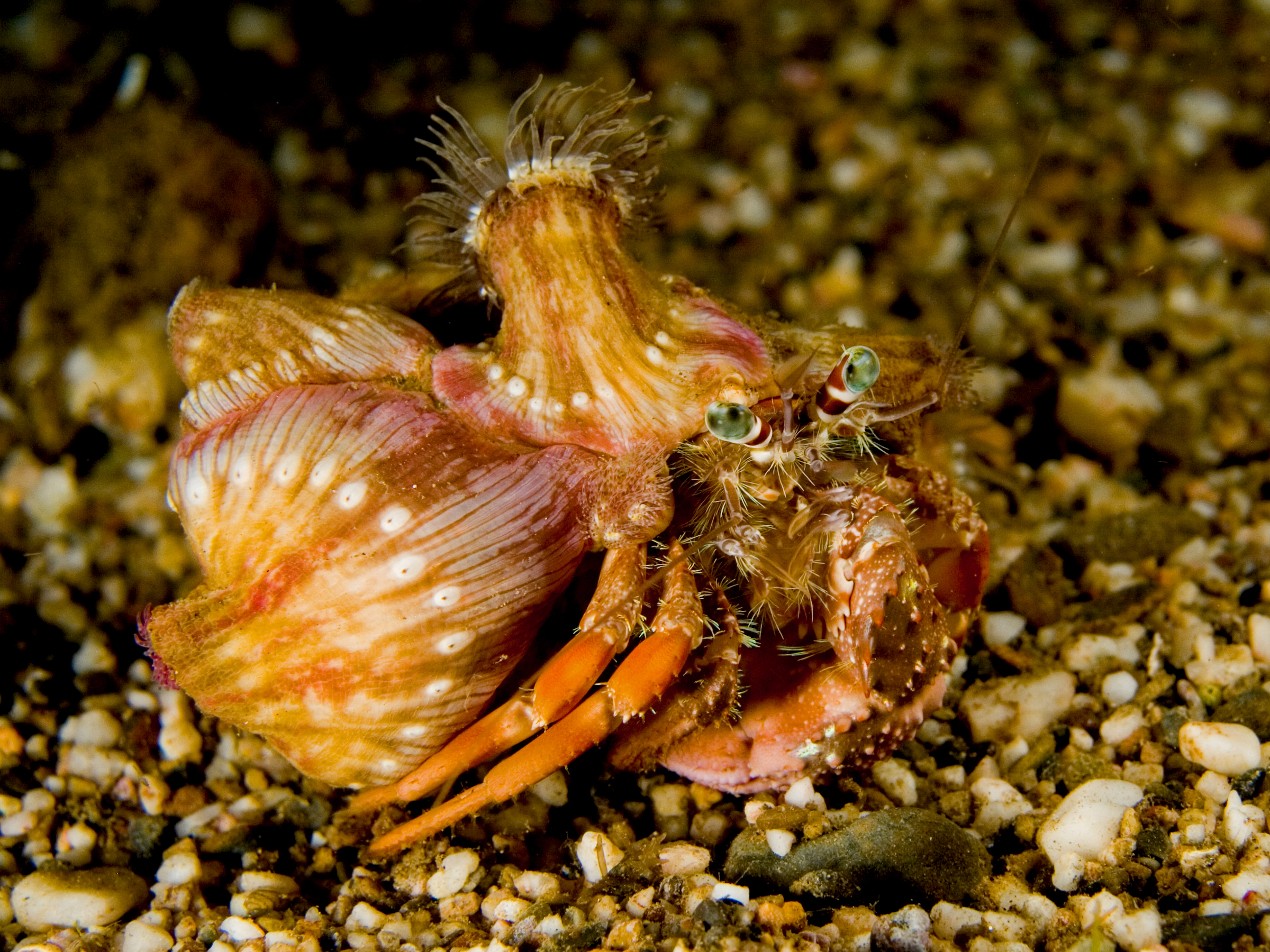
Dardanus pedunculatus

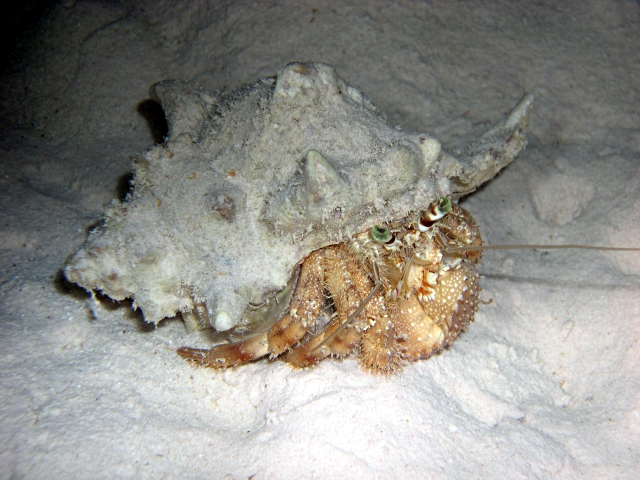
Dardanus tinctor
