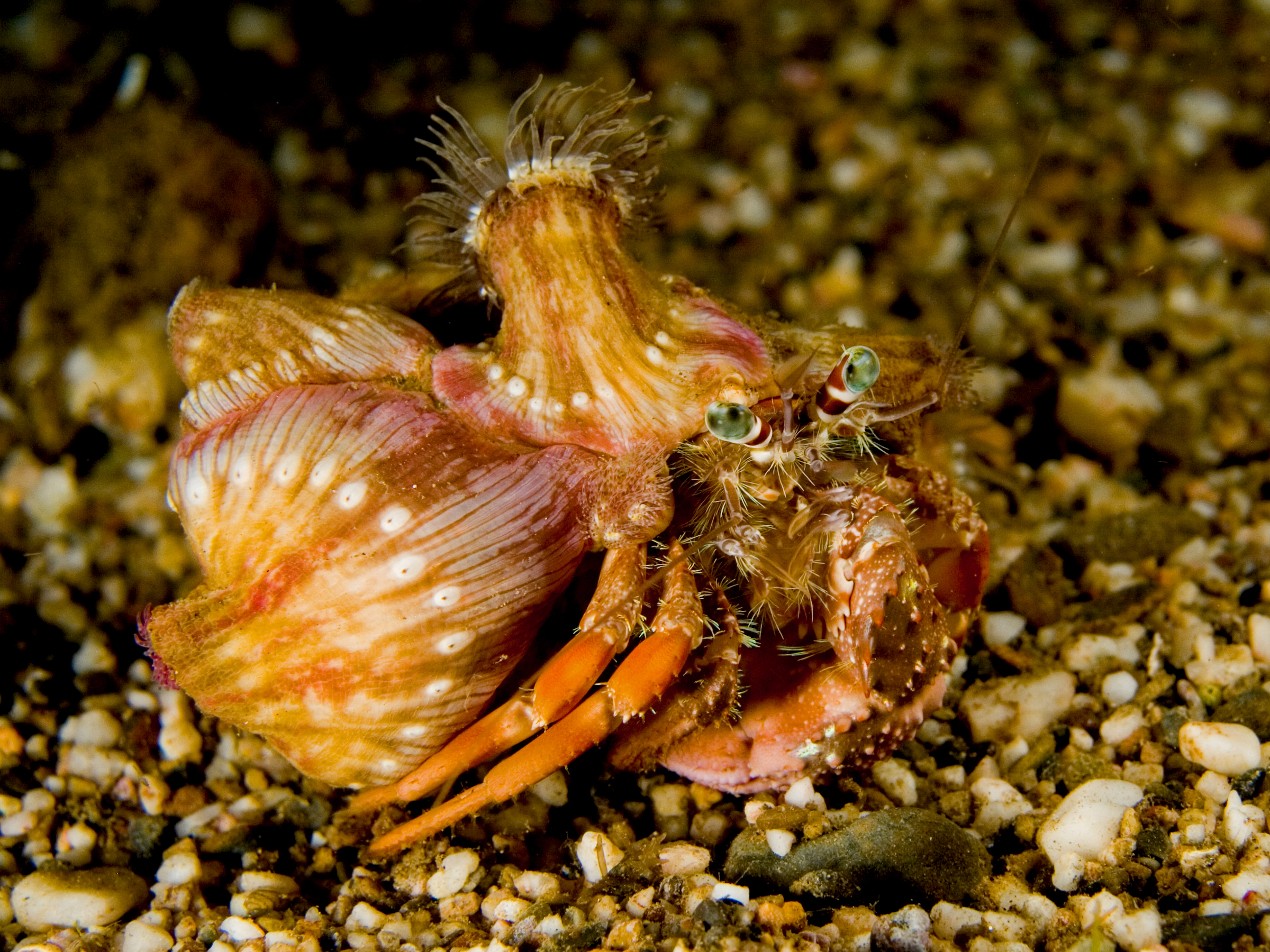

Scientific classification
- Domain: Eukaryota
- Kingdom: Animalia
- Phylum: Arthropoda
- Class: Malacostraca
- Order: Decapoda
- Suborder: Pleocyemata
- Infraorder: Anomura
- Family: Diogenidae
- Genus: Dardanus
- Species: D. pedunculatus

Binomial name
- Dardanus pedunculatus (J. F. W. Herbst, 1804)

Synonyms
- Cancer pedunculatus Herbst, 1804; Pagurus asper De Haan, 1849; Pagurus sigmoidalis Zehntner, 1894; Dardanus haani Rathbun, 1902; Neopagurus horai Kaamalaveni, 1950

= Dardanus pedunculatus =

Species of crustacean

Dardanus pedunculatus, commonly referred to as the anemone hermit crab, is a species of hermit crab from the Indo-Pacific region. It lives at depths of up to 27 m and collects sea anemones to place on its shell for defence.

== Distribution ==
Dardanus pedunculatus has a broad distribution in the Indo-Pacific region, from the Seychelles in the west to Japan and Hawaii in the east. In Australia, it is found from New South Wales (as far south at Port Jackson) to Queensland.

== Ecology ==
D. pedunculatus usually lives on coral reefs and in the intertidal zone, at depths of 1–27 metres (3–89 ft). It usually carries sea anemones on its shell, which it uses to protect itself from its main predator, cephalopods of the genus Octopus. The anemones are collected at night, and comprises the crab stroking and tapping the anemone until it loosens its grip on the substrate, at which point it is moved onto the gastropod shell that the hermit crab inhabits.

== Description ==
Dardanus pedunculatus usually attain a maximum size of 10 centimetres (4 in). The carapace is mottled in tan and cream, while the eyestalks are white with red bands. The sexes are similar. The left claw is much larger than the right claw.

== Pets ==
Hermit crabs are popular pets in marine aquaria, and Dardanus pedunculatus is occasionally kept, although the species has not been successfully reared in captivity.

== Taxonomic history ==
Dardanus pedunculatus was first described by Johann Friedrich Wilhelm Herbst as Cancer pedunculatus, in his 1804 work Versuch einer Naturgeschichte der Krabben und Krebse nebst einer Systematischen Beschreibung ihrer verschiedenen Arten; the type locality is not known. It has since been placed in a number of different genera, including Pagurus and Neopagurus, and a number of taxonomic synonyms have been created.
