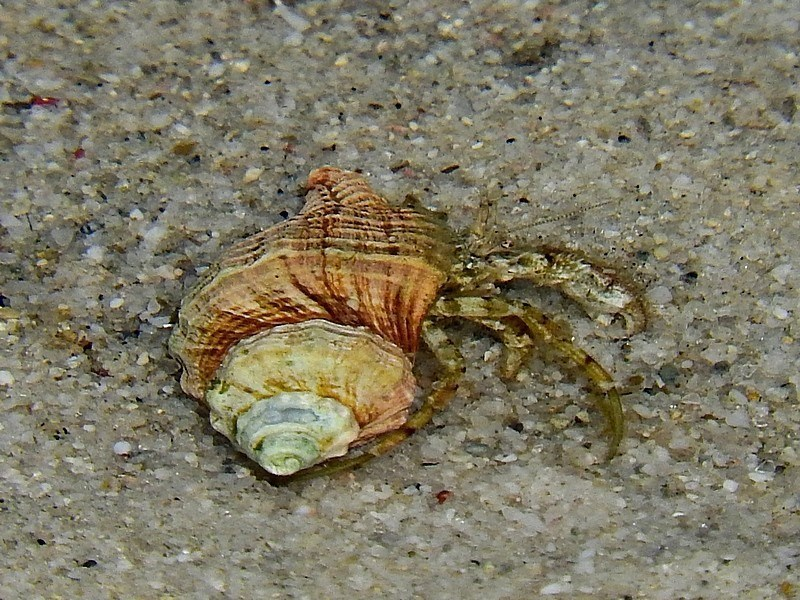

Scientific classification
- Domain: Eukaryota
- Kingdom: Animalia
- Phylum: Arthropoda
- Class: Malacostraca
- Order: Decapoda
- Suborder: Pleocyemata
- Infraorder: Anomura
- Family: Diogenidae
- Genus: Diogenes
- Species: D. senex

Binomial name
- Diogenes senex Heller, 1865

= Diogenes senex =

Species of crustacean

Diogenes senex is a species of left handed hermit crab (family Diogenidae) first described in 1865 by Camill Heller.

It is endemic to Australia, where it is found in estuaries, and intertidal flats in the muddy sands of subtidal zones of the coasts of New South Wales, the Northern Territory, and Queensland.
