= Aniculus hopperae =

Scientific classification
- Kingdom: Animalia
- Phylum: Arthropoda
- Clade: Pancrustacea
- Class: Malacostraca
- Order: Decapoda
- Suborder: Pleocyemata
- Infraorder: Anomura
- Family: Diogenidae
- Genus: Aniculus
- Species: A. hopperae

Binomial name
- Aniculus hopperae McLaughlin & Hoover, 1996

Species of hermit crab

Aniculus hopperae, also known as reticulated Hawaiian hermit, is a species of hermit crab in the family Diogenidae from the Pacific Ocean. The specific name hopperae honors Carol N. Hopper from Waikīkī Aquarium.

== Description ==
This species stands out from its congeners in appearance. Aniculus hopperae features a bright red base coloration with black "bracelets" on the scissor arms, unlike the similar Aniculus simbogae, which lacks this pattern. Typically medium-sized, the holotype specimen from Oahu, Hawaii, measures 6.3 mm (0.25 in) in shield length and was collected at a depth of 8 m (26 ft). The hermit crab's arms are red with black spots, its eyestalks have a bright orange hue, and it displays a web-like white pattern. These distinct markings help in identifying the species.

== Distribution and habitat ==
Aniculus hopperae is known from a number of localities in the Pacific: Hawaii (type locality: Oahu), Line Islands, Marquesas Islands, and Clipperton Island. Aniculus hopperae predominantly inhabits rocky coastlines, where it seeks shelter under small outcroppings and within caves. In Hawaii, it thrives at depths of up to 23 m (75 ft).
