= Pagurus forbesii =

Scientific classification
- Kingdom: Animalia
- Phylum: Arthropoda
- Clade: Pancrustacea
- Class: Malacostraca
- Order: Decapoda
- Suborder: Pleocyemata
- Infraorder: Anomura
- Family: Paguridae
- Genus: Pagurus
- Species: P. forbesii

Binomial name
- Pagurus forbesii Bell, 1845

Synonyms
- Eupagurus sculptimanus (Lucas, 1846); Pagurus sculptimanus Lucas, 1846

Species of crustacean

Pagurus forbesii is a species of hermit crab in the family Paguridae. It is found in the northeastern Atlantic Ocean and the Mediterranean Sea.

== Taxonomy ==
This species was first described by the English zoologist Thomas Bell, writing in the publication, A history of British Crustacea IV. Although the year is usually given as 1846, the part of this publication concerned was actually published in the last week of 1845. The type locality was Falmouth in England. Later in 1846, the French zoologist Hippolyte Lucas described Pagurus sculptimanus from Oran, and this was later determined to be a synonym of P. forbesii.

== Description ==
The genus Pagurus consists of around 170 species including 13 found in the eastern Atlantic Ocean. Of these 13, Pagurus forbesii and Pagurus cuanensis are distinctive in having long eyestalks, and the males have characteristic pleopods numbered 2 to 5 on the left. The carapace can grow to a length of about 8.5 mm (0.33 in). The right chela (claw) is hairy and somewhat granulated; the propodus (penultimate segment) has a depression on either side of a long ridge that extends onto the dactylus. The visible portions of this hermit crab are reddish yellow, with darker spotting being present on the abdomen.

== Distribution and habitat ==
Pagurus forbesii occurs in the northeastern Atlantic Ocean and the Mediterranean Sea, its depth range being 25 to 35 m (82 to 115 ft). It inhabits sandy seabeds with coarse and medium-sized grains, as well as coral rubble.

== Ecology ==
Like other hermit crabs, P. forbesii uses the empty shells of gastropod molluscs to live in. This crab has been found inhabiting shells of the cornet (Cerithium vulgatum), the thick-lipped dogwhelk (Tritia incrassata), the common tower shell (Turritella communis) and Ocinebrina aciculata. The sea anemone Adamsia palliata often lives on the shell occupied by a hermit crab; usually this is a shell used by Pagurus prideaux, but in the Bay of Naples in Italy, about 8% of the shells occupied by P. forbesii were found to be colonised by the sea anemone.

Three species of hermit crab were found to be present in a bay near Cadiz in southern Spain. Paguristes eremita were the biggest and positively selected the largest and most robust available gastropod shells. Diogenes pugilator and P. forbesii occupied similar-size, lighter shells, but despite being much more abundant, D. pugilator tended not to inhabit the commonest shell Turritella turbona, while P. forbesii seemed to preferentially select them. On occasions, D. pugilator continued to inhabit a shell whose aperture it had outgrown, while P. forbesii and P. eremita moved on to larger shells as they grew.
