= Diogenes avarus =

Scientific classification
- Domain: Eukaryota
- Kingdom: Animalia
- Phylum: Arthropoda
- Class: Malacostraca
- Order: Decapoda
- Suborder: Pleocyemata
- Infraorder: Anomura
- Family: Diogenidae
- Genus: Diogenes
- Species: D. avarus

Binomial name
- Diogenes avarus Heller, 1865

Species of crustacean

Diogenes avarus is a species of left-handed hermit crab (family Diogenidae) first described in 1865 by Camill Heller.

In Australia, it is found in the sands of intertidal zones of the coasts of Northern Territory, Queensland, and Western Australia. It is also found in such zones on the coasts of Indo-west Pacific Ocean, the Red Sea and the coasts of Malaysia, Indonesia and the Philippines.
