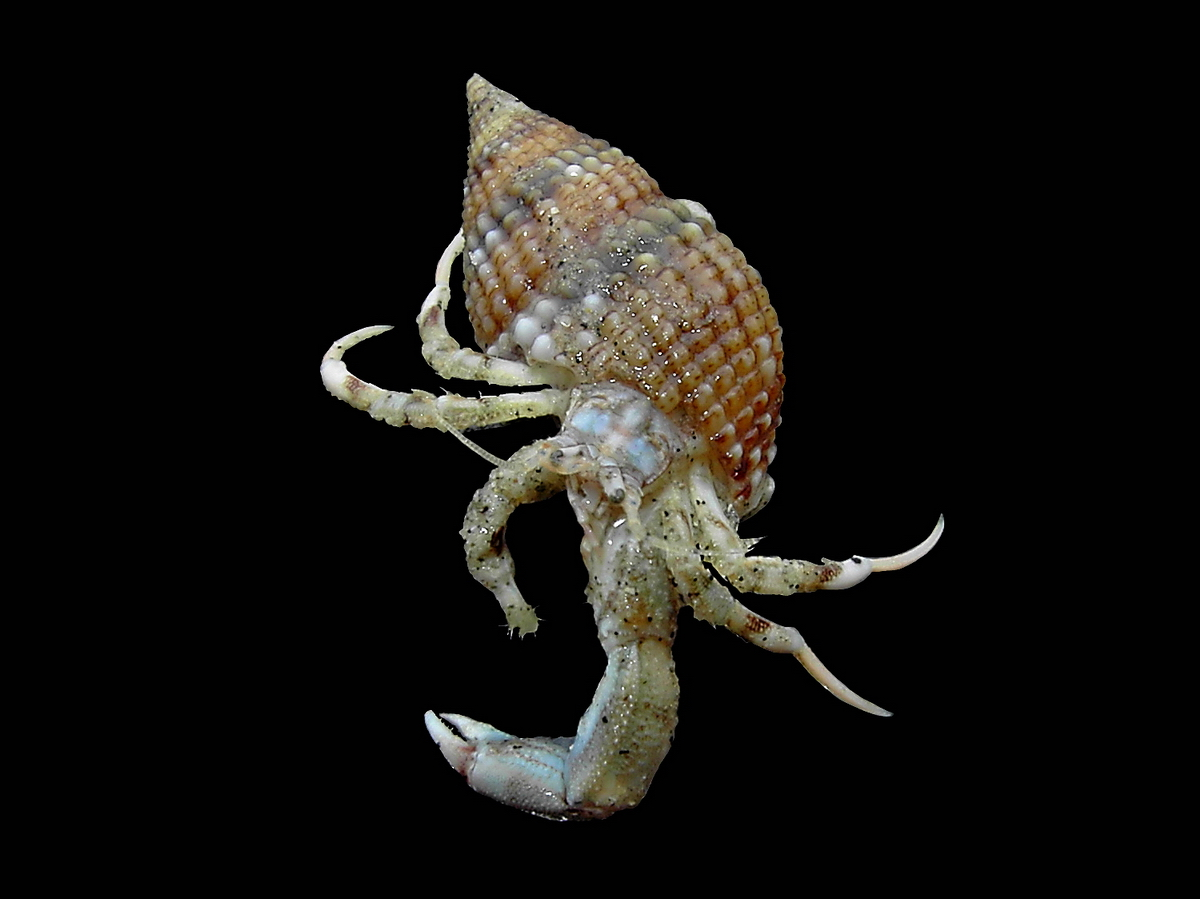
- In a Tritia reticulata shell

Scientific classification
- Domain: Eukaryota
- Kingdom: Animalia
- Phylum: Arthropoda
- Class: Malacostraca
- Order: Decapoda
- Suborder: Pleocyemata
- Infraorder: Anomura
- Family: Diogenidae
- Genus: Diogenes
- Species: D. pugilator

Binomial name
- Diogenes pugilator (Roux, 1829)

Synonyms
- Pagurus algarbiensis de Brito Capello, 1875; Pagurus arenarius Lucas, 1846; Pagurus bocagii de Brito Capello, 1875; Pagurus curvimanus Clement, 1874; Pagurus dillvyni A. Milne-Edwards & Bouvier, 1900; Pagurus dillwynii Bate, 1851; Pagurus dilwynnii Alcock, 1905; Pagurus lafonit Fischer, 1872; Pagurus ponticus Kessler, 1860; Pagurus pugilator Roux, 1829; Pagurus varians Costa, 1838

= Diogenes pugilator =

Species of crustacean

Diogenes pugilator is a species of hermit crab, sometimes called the small hermit crab or south-claw hermit crab. It is found from the coast of Angola to as far north as the North Sea, and eastwards through the Mediterranean Sea, Black Sea and Red Sea. Populations of D. pugilator may be kept in check by the predatory crab Liocarcinus depurator.

This crab was first described in 1829 by Jean Louis Florent Polydore Roux as Pagurus pugilator.

== Description ==
Like other hermit crabs, D. pugilator conceals its soft abdomen inside an empty gastropod mollusc shell; the abdomen is twisted to fit the contours of the shell. The carapace protects the anterior part of the crab and can be up to 11 mm (0.43 in) long; it is squarish in shape, has triangular projections along the front edge, and is clad with hairs on the front two corners. The eyes are on stalks which are about half as long as the width of the carapace. The left chela (claw) is very much larger than the right one, and both claws are covered with short hairs. The chelae and other legs can be contracted into the entrance of the shell.

== Distribution and habitat ==
D. pugilator is native to the temperate and subtropical eastern Atlantic Ocean. Its range extends from the southern North Sea southwards to Angola, the Mediterranean Sea, the Black Sea and the Red Sea. Its northern limit was at one time thought to be Swansea in South Wales, but it has since been found as far north as Anglesey, and the coasts of southwestern Ireland. It is found on soft substrates from the shallow sub-tidal to depths of as much as 1,800 m (5,906 ft), but is most common in shallow water.

== Ecology ==
This is a small hermit crab which tends to occupy shells of the netted dog whelk Tritia reticulata. These crabs are often present on flattish beaches composed of medium to fine grained sand where the waves sweep up the shore. When exposed, they rapidly bury themselves in the sand, using the enlarged left chela to stabilise themselves in the wet sand and limit the extent to which they are rolled about by the waves.

Near Cádiz in southern Spain, there are three species of hermit crab, D. pugilator, Paguristes eremita and Pagurus forbesii. Of these, P. eremita is the biggest and strongest, and makes use of the most robust gastropod shells with the widest apertures. D. pugilator is the most numerous but tends not to use the shells of the most common gastropod, Turritella turbona, which are used preferentially by P. forbesii. D. pugilator instead uses the less common Tritia reticulata, even when the crab's carapace is so large that it overlaps the shell's aperture.
