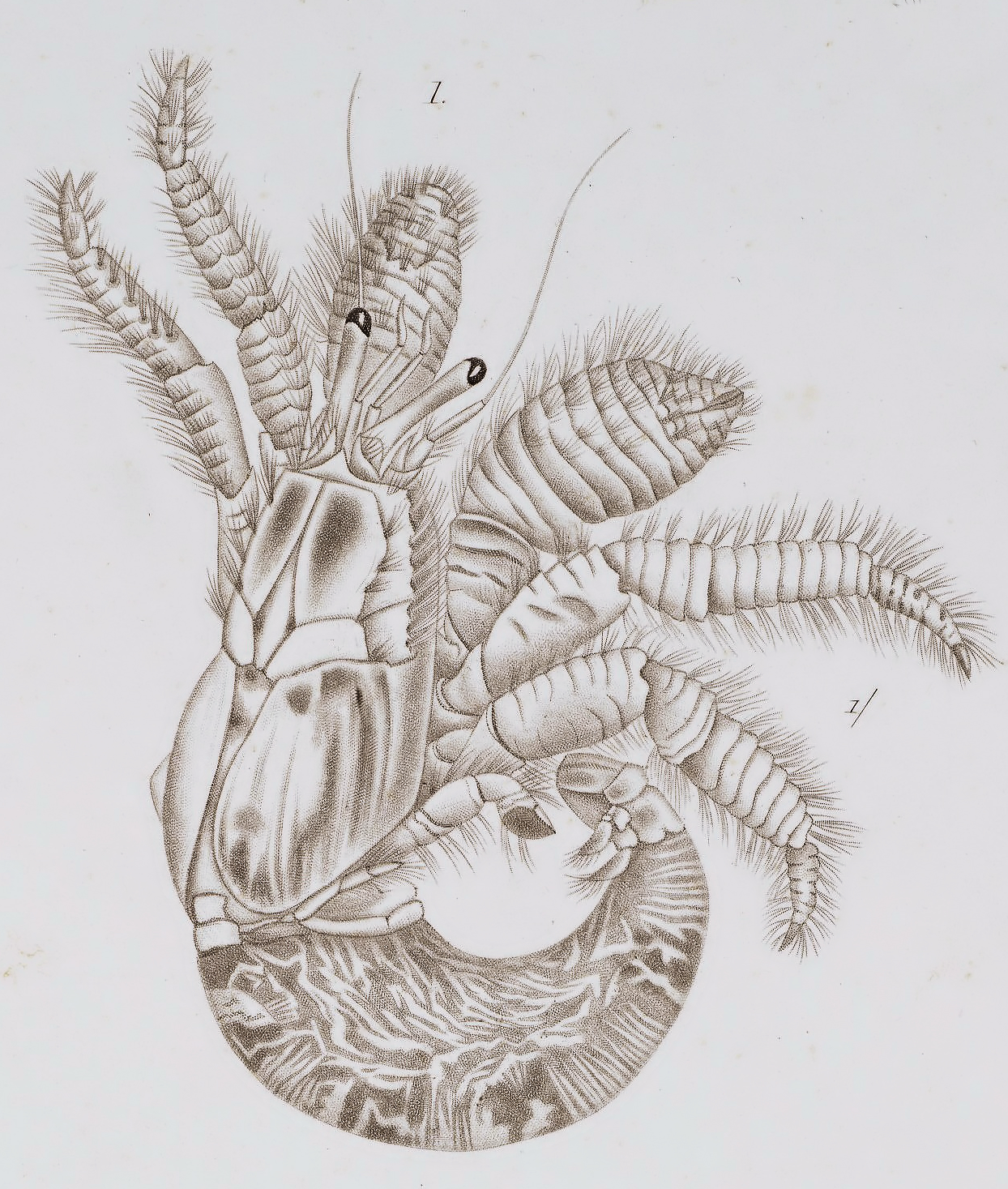

Scientific classification
- Kingdom: Animalia
- Phylum: Arthropoda
- Clade: Pancrustacea
- Class: Malacostraca
- Order: Decapoda
- Suborder: Pleocyemata
- Infraorder: Anomura
- Superfamily: Paguroidea
- Family: Diogenidae
- Genus: Aniculus
- Species: A. aniculus

Binomial name
- Aniculus aniculus (Fabricius, 1787)

Synonyms
- Aniculus typicus Dana, 1852 junior subjective synonym (unnecessary replacement name); Pagurus aniculus Fabricius, 1787 superseded combination

= Aniculus aniculus =

Species of hermit crab

Aniculus aniculus, the red hermit crab or scaly-legged hermit crab, is a species of aquatic hermit crab of the family Diogenidae. It is distributed across French Polynesia in the Gambier, Marquesas, Society, and Tuamotu archipelagoes. It has also been recorded in the Mozambique Channel and around Mauritius. Of the species in the genus Aniculus, only it and A. ursus are considered common. The species is the host of the parasitic isopod Parathelges aniculi, and it is one of several hermit crabs preyed upon by Nautilus macromphalus.

== Description ==
As adults, individuals of the species grow up to 20 centimeters long. One differentiating characteristic of the species is that females possess leaf-like structures on their front three appendages that combine with a large brood-flap to create a full brood-pouch. These crabs reside within the compact shells of gastropods like Muricidae and Cerithiidae.

== Taxonomy ==
The species was originally described as Pagurus aniculus by Johan Christian Fabricius in 1793, a designation that was reaffirmed more than half a dozen times through the 18th century. In 1852, James Dwight Dana created the new genus Aniculus by splitting it from Pagurus. The separation was justified by differences in the arrangement of the chelipeds, the short and blunt shape of the fingers, and because the abdominal appendages in females split in two branches and not three. Instead of retaining the specific epithet aniculus, Dana changed it to typicus, creating the new and invalid combination Aniculus typicus. Despite being a tautonym, the double name Aniculus aniculus is valid and acceptable under zoological nomenclatural conventions.
