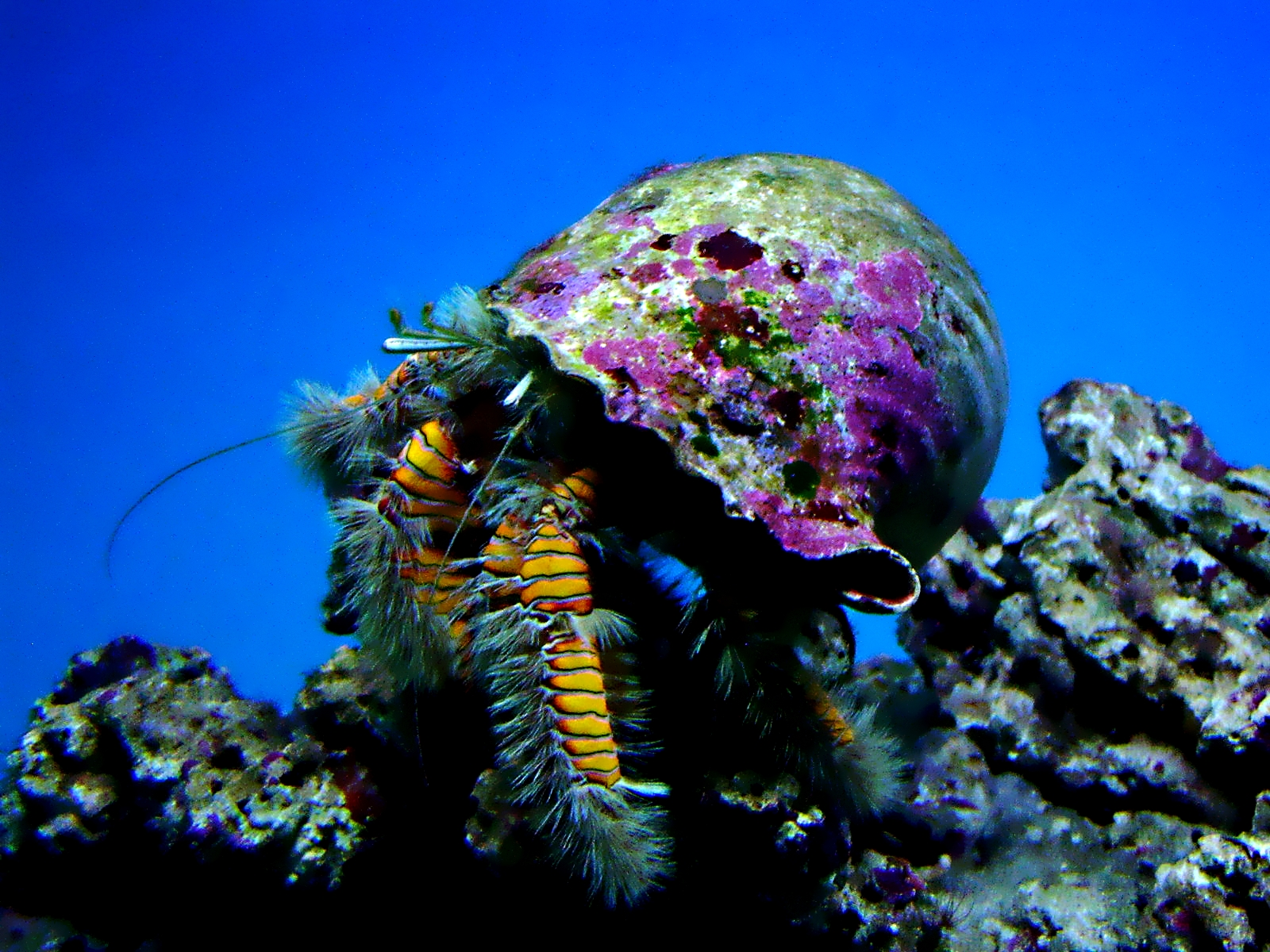

Scientific classification
- Kingdom: Animalia
- Phylum: Arthropoda
- Clade: Pancrustacea
- Class: Malacostraca
- Order: Decapoda
- Suborder: Pleocyemata
- Infraorder: Anomura
- Family: Diogenidae
- Genus: Aniculus
- Species: A. maximus

Binomial name
- Aniculus maximus Edmondson, 1952

= Aniculus maximus =

Species of crustacean

Aniculus maximus, the hairy yellow hermit crab or large hairy hermit crab, is an aquatic hermit crab of the family Diogenidae.

== Description ==
Its colour ranges from intense red to golden yellow. It has white hairy bristles that extend from under its distinct yellow legs. Its shield is marked with a series of furrows.

The hermit crab's width can reach up to 10 cm (3.9 in). Charles H. Edmonson of the Honolulu Bishop Museum gave it the name "maximus" or "the greatest" to describes its large size, as its known to grow up to the size of a hand.

== Distribution ==
It is found in the Indo-Pacific region and inhabit the Benthic zone which ranges from 10–100 metres (33–328 ft) deep. They are most commonly found at depths of 15 metres (50 ft) or deeper and habit ledges or caves. At shallower depths of their habitat range, around 15 metres (49 ft) deep, they have been observed on coral reefs, rock reefs, and barrel sponges.

It tends to feed on mollusks and has been seen killing them over a range of days for their shell. Aside from mollusks, the hairy yellow hermit crab is an omnivore and will eat algae or other meat it can find.

== Reproduction ==
The mating process of Aniculus maximus begins with a ritual initiated by olfactory and tactile indicators. It reproduces sexually and indirectly through the use of spermatophores. After mating, the female hermit crab keeps the fertilized eggs inside the underside of her shell. The eggs hatch into planktonic larvae that find shells of their own once mature enough.
