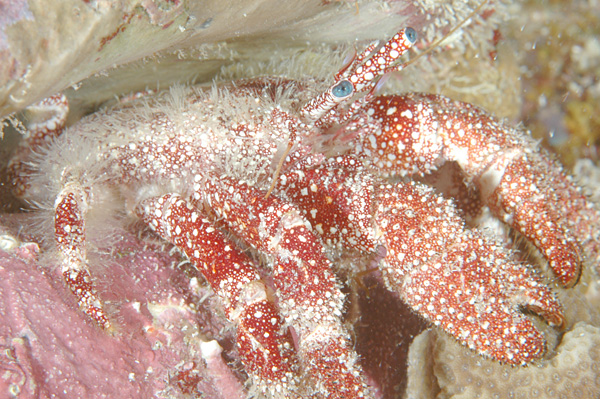

Scientific classification
- Domain: Eukaryota
- Kingdom: Animalia
- Phylum: Arthropoda
- Class: Malacostraca
- Order: Decapoda
- Suborder: Pleocyemata
- Infraorder: Anomura
- Family: Diogenidae
- Genus: Paguristes
- Species: P. puncticeps

Binomial name
- Paguristes puncticeps Benedict, 1901

= Paguristes puncticeps =

Species of crustacean

Paguristes puncticeps is a hermit crab, in the family Diogenidae. It is found in shallow waters in the tropical western Atlantic Ocean, the Caribbean Sea and the Gulf of Mexico. Like other hermit crabs, it lives inside an empty mollusc shell, which it changes periodically as it grows.

== Description ==
P. puncticeps is a large hermit crab, growing to a length of 8 to 13 cm (3 to 5 in), including the limbs and chelae (claws). It is a dark red or rusty-brown colour with the hairy carapace and limbs spotted boldly with white. The antennae and eye stalks are also dark red and the irises of the eyes are blue. In most members of this family, the left chela is larger than the right one, but in the case of P. puncticeps, there is little difference in size between the two.

== Distribution and habitat ==
P. puncticeps occurs in the tropical western Atlantic Ocean, the Caribbean Sea and the Gulf of Mexico. Its range extends from Florida to Brazil and includes Cuba, Guadeloupe, Martinique and Saint-Martin. Its depth range is from the low tide mark down to about 40 m (130 ft). It usually occurs in coral reef habitats.

== Ecology ==
P. puncticeps is a scavenger and detritivore, feeding on any animal or vegetable matter that it finds. Breeding takes place throughout the year. The first larval stages take place in the egg, which then hatches into a planktonic zoeal larva. When fully developed, this settles on the seabed and undergoes metamorphosis into a juvenile, which will need to find a small vacant shell in which to live. The empty shells of the queen conch (Aliger gigas) are often used by this hermit crab, and shells of the Florida horse conch (Triplofusus papillosus), the largest gastropod mollusc in the northern Gulf of Mexico, are favoured by larger individuals, as are the large snails on which this mollusc preys.

A factor limiting populations of hermit crabs in any area is often the availability of empty gastropod shells for them to occupy. Cephalopods such as the common octopus (Octopus vulgaris) and the Caribbean reef octopus (Octopus briareus) feed on lobsters, crabs, hermit crabs, and molluscs, often carrying their prey back to their den, where they deposit the inedible parts nearby, forming a midden. They often extract their prey through the aperture of the shell, leaving the structure intact. The midden constitutes a source of empty shells available for use by hermit crabs, and P. puncticeps individuals have been observed carrying empty shells away from the pile. The middens also attract hermit crabs which feed on food scraps left by the octopus, but feeding close to the octopus den is a risky business. Smaller hermit crabs (shield length less than 5 mm (0.2 in)) sometimes live inside the octopus den, feeding on food scraps discarded by the octopus.
