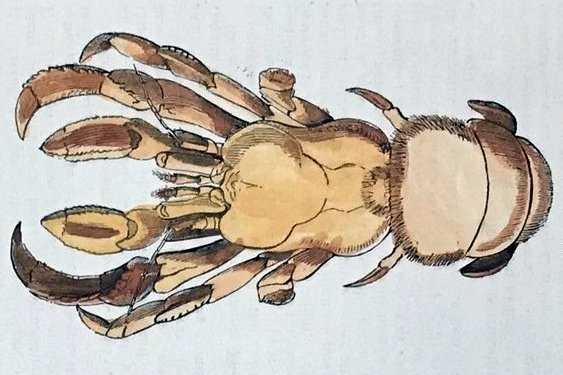
- Cancellus typus

Scientific classification
- Domain: Eukaryota
- Kingdom: Animalia
- Phylum: Arthropoda
- Class: Malacostraca
- Order: Decapoda
- Suborder: Pleocyemata
- Infraorder: Anomura
- Family: Diogenidae
- Genus: Cancellus; H. Milne-Edwards, 1836

= Cancellus (crustacean) =

Genus of crustaceans

Cancellus is a genus of hermit crabs in the family Diogenidae. Members of this genus are most commonly found living in small crevices in the outer continental shelf at mesophotic depths. They can be found living in rocks, sponges, and algae among other places. The genus has a cosmopolitan distribution. Four species are known from the western Atlantic (C. heatherae, C. ornatus, C. viridis, and C. spongicola).

== Species ==
Cancellus contains the following species:

- Cancellus canaliculatus (Herbst, 1804)
- Cancellus frontalis Forest & McLaughlin, 2000
- Cancellus heatherae Felder & Lemaitre, 2020
- Cancellus investigatoris Alcock, 1905
- Cancellus laticoxa Forest & McLaughlin, 2000
- Cancellus makrothrix Stebbing, 1924
- Cancellus mayoae Forest & McLaughlin, 1998
- Cancellus ornatus Benedict, 1901
- Cancellus panglaoensis McLaughlin, 2008
- Cancellus parfaiti A. Milne-Edwards & Bouvier, 1891
- Cancellus quadraticoxa Morgan & Forest, 1991
- Cancellus rhynchogonus Forest & McLaughlin, 2000
- Cancellus sphaerogonus Forest & McLaughlin, 2000
- Cancellus spongicola Benedict, 1901
- Cancellus tanneri Faxon, 1893
- Cancellus typus H. Milne-Edwards, 1836
- Cancellus viridis Mayo, 1973
