= Paguristes ulreyi =

Scientific classification
- Domain: Eukaryota
- Kingdom: Animalia
- Phylum: Arthropoda
- Class: Malacostraca
- Order: Decapoda
- Suborder: Pleocyemata
- Infraorder: Anomura
- Family: Diogenidae
- Genus: Paguristes
- Species: P. ulreyi

Binomial name
- Paguristes ulreyi (Schmitt, 1921)

Species of crustacean

Paguristes ulreyi, or the furry hermit crab, is a hermit crab in the family Diogenidae. It is known for its furry body, which allows it to capture detritus. It lives in the waters of California in the Pacific Ocean and can be up to an inch wide.
