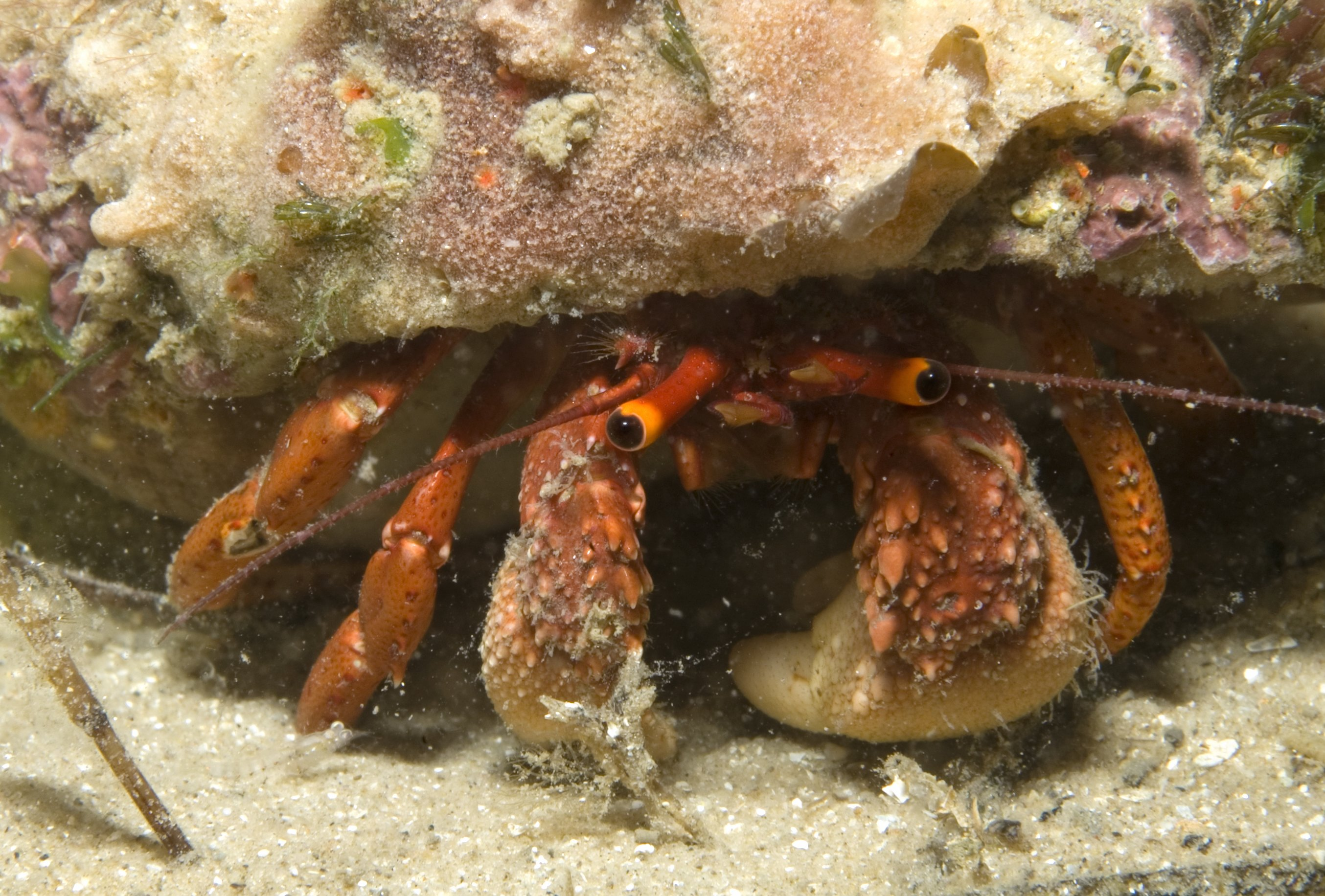

Scientific classification
- Domain: Eukaryota
- Kingdom: Animalia
- Phylum: Arthropoda
- Class: Malacostraca
- Order: Decapoda
- Suborder: Pleocyemata
- Infraorder: Anomura
- Family: Diogenidae
- Genus: Paguristes
- Species: P. frontalis

Binomial name
- Paguristes frontalis (H. Milne Edwards, 1836)

= Paguristes frontalis =

Species of crustacean

Paguristes frontalis is a hermit crab, in the family Diogenidae. P. frontalis is left-handed. Its left hand is either larger or equal in size with the right. Paguristes frontalis lives in the waters of South Australia to Western Australia. They can go in water as shallow as 8 metres. The estimated length of P. frontalis is 8 centimetres. P. frontalis can have the ability to carry a shell 15 cm long. Paguristes frontalis commonly preys on dead animals. At other times, P. frontalis may be able to catch other crabs and other living prey.
