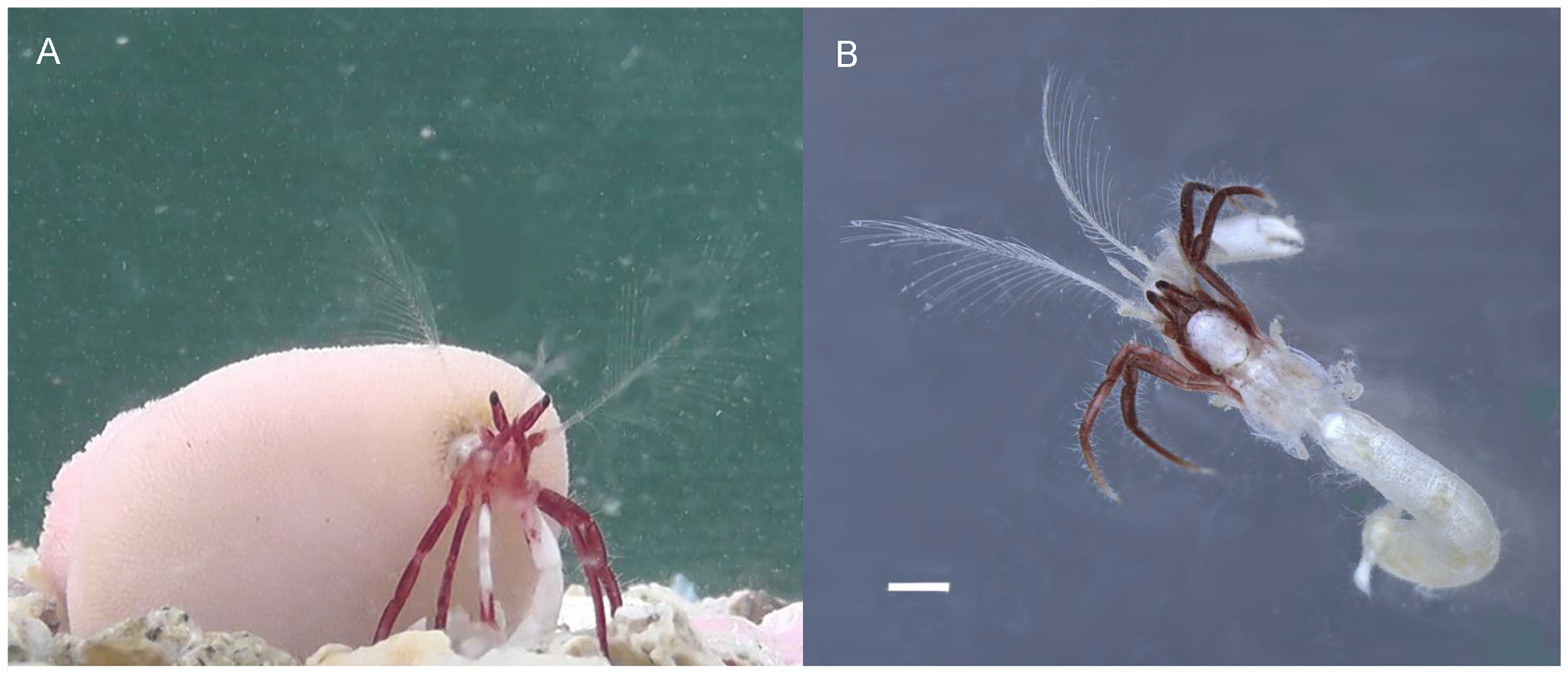
- A, an individual in an aquarium, carrying the coral. B, an individual removed from its host coral. Scale bar: 1 mm.

Scientific classification
- Kingdom: Animalia
- Phylum: Arthropoda
- Clade: Pancrustacea
- Class: Malacostraca
- Order: Decapoda
- Suborder: Pleocyemata
- Infraorder: Anomura
- Family: Diogenidae
- Genus: Diogenes
- Species: D. heteropsammicola

Binomial name
- Diogenes heteropsammicola Igawa & Kato 2017

= Diogenes heteropsammicola =

Species of hermit crab

Diogenes heteropsammicola is a species of hermit crab discovered in the shallow waters of the Japanese Amami Islands during samplings between 2012 and 2016. D. heteropsammicola is strongly associated with the walking corals, Heterocyathus and Heteropsammia. This hermit crab species is unique in how its members use living, growing coral as shells.

== Appearance ==
D. heteropsammicola can be distinguished from other types of hermit crab by their thin chelipeds and leg shape. In contrast to other hermit crabs, which usually have asymmetrical bodies, D. heteropsammicola has a symmetrical abdomen and slender legs to help with living in coral.

D. heteropsammicola exhibits morphological features that allow it to live in coral cavities, including a slender body and specialized appendages that help anchor it within the coral skeleton. These traits are uncommon in related hermit crab species.

== Behavior ==
D. heteropsammicola lives inside mobile corals of the genus Heteropsammia and Heterocyathus, a rare example of a hermit crab using a living coral rather than a mollusk shell.

The heteropsammicola carries the host coral across the ocean floors to keep from being buried in sediment. This is similar to the role of the sipunculan worms that once filled the corals themselves. The type of relationship that the hermit crabs have with the shells can be seen as a symbiotic relationship. This prevents the crabs from having to continuously look for new shells as they grow. This unique behavior allows the crab to benefit from the coral's mobility and protection, while the coral receives cleaning and mobility from the crab. Crustaceans of this type commonly replace their shell as the organism grows in size. D. heteropsammicola is the only species of hermit crab known to partner with living coral. When feeding, D. heteropsammicola moves its antennae in circular motions to create water currents that help capture organic particles. It then uses its mouthparts to collect food particles caught on its antennae.

== Ecology ==
Heteropsammia and Heterocyathus are the two solitary corals that D. heteropsammicola has been observed occupying. These two coral species are also used as a home by symbiotic Sipuncula of the genus Aspidosiphon, which normally occupy the corals that were previously occupied by crabs. This relationship has been described as a "mutualism shift", where a different species takes over the role of a former symbiotic partner.

The relationship between D. heteropsammicola and solitary corals is considered an example of mutualism and evolutionary adaptation in symbiotic relationships. It is hypothesized that this behavior may have evolved to help hermit crabs survive in environments where empty shells are scarce.

== Discovery ==
This species was discovered and described in 2016 by Momoko Igawa and Makoto Kato, Japanese researchers from Kyoto University, studying coral reef ecosystems in southern Japan. Its discovery challenged prior assumptions about hermit crab behavior and the ecological flexibility of coral symbioses.

This species has become a subject of interest in studying symbiosis and environmental adaptation in marine invertebrates.
