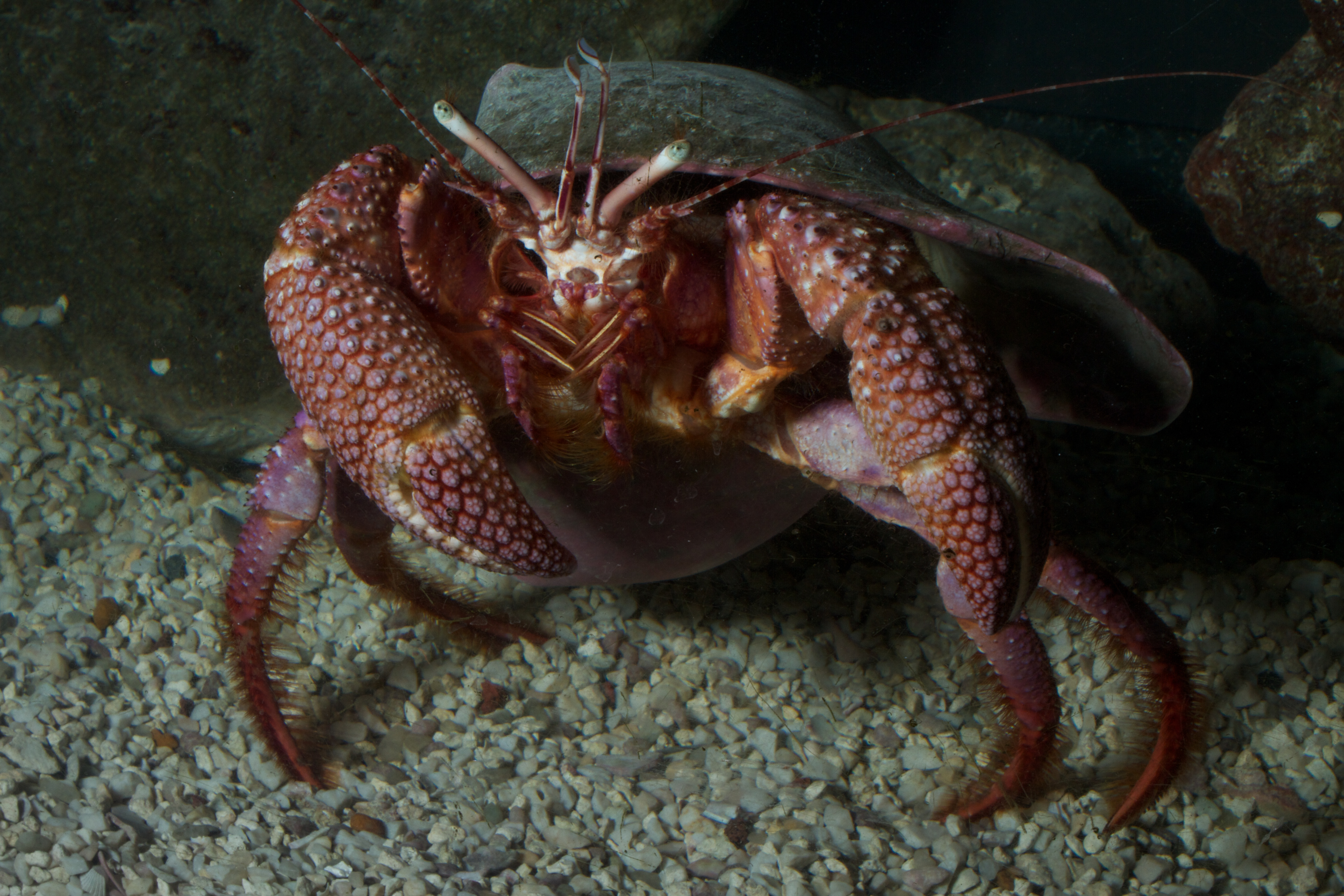

Scientific classification
- Kingdom: Animalia
- Phylum: Arthropoda
- Clade: Pancrustacea
- Class: Malacostraca
- Order: Decapoda
- Suborder: Pleocyemata
- Infraorder: Anomura
- Family: Diogenidae
- Genus: Petrochirus
- Species: P. diogenes

Binomial name
- Petrochirus diogenes (Linnaeus, 1758)

= Petrochirus diogenes =

Species of crustacean

The giant hermit crab (Petrochirus diogenes) is a species of marine hermit crab. This species lives in the Caribbean Sea, and often inhabits conch shells. This species of hermit crab is large enough that it can inhabit a fully grown shell of the queen conch. It will attack and eat a conch, thus obtaining a meal and a shell. It was originally described by Carl Linnaeus as Cancer diogenes; the specific epithet honours Diogenes of Sinope.

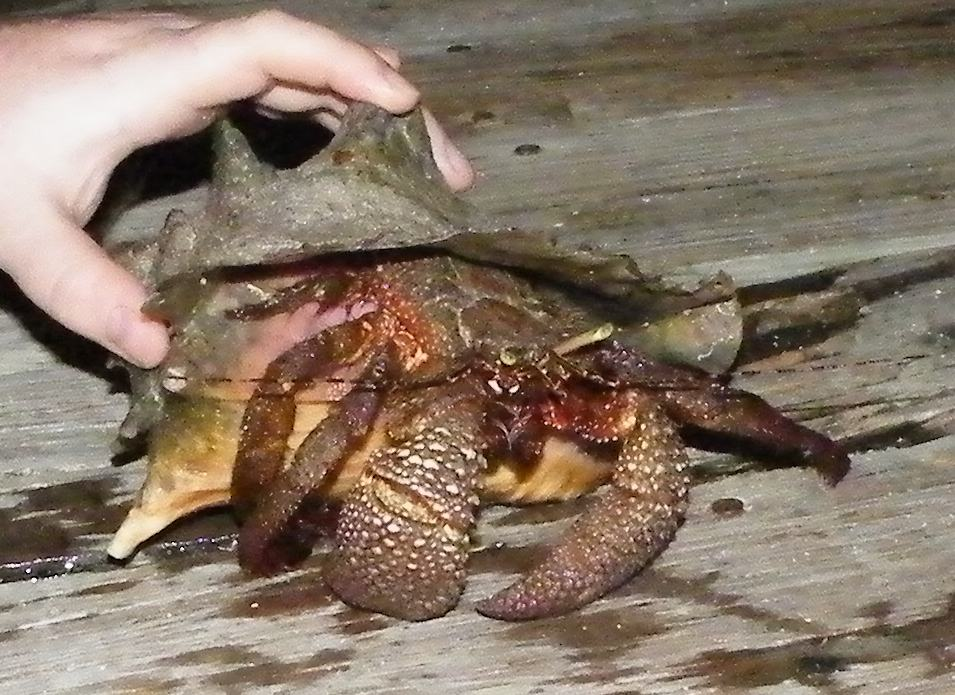
Petrochirus diogenes in a subadult shell of a queen conch.
