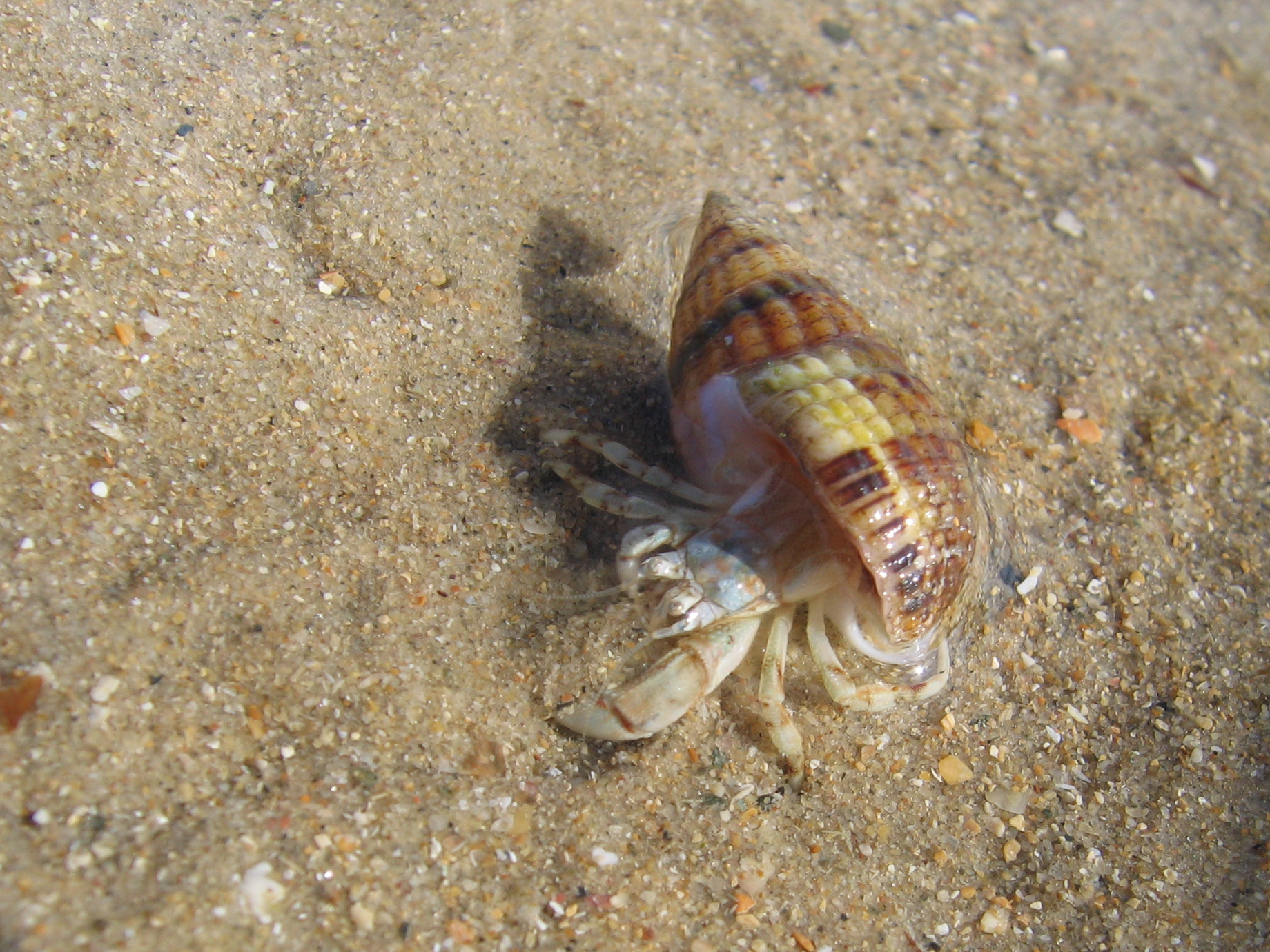
- Diogenes pugilator

Scientific classification
- Kingdom: Animalia
- Phylum: Arthropoda
- Class: Malacostraca
- Order: Decapoda
- Suborder: Pleocyemata
- Infraorder: Anomura
- Family: Diogenidae
- Genus: Diogenes; Dana, 1851

Type species
- Pagurus miles Fabricius, 1787

= Diogenes (crustacean) =

Genus of crustaceans

Diogenes is a genus of hermit crabs.

- Diogenes alias McLaughlin & Holthuis, 2001
- Diogenes avarus Heller, 1865
- Diogenes bicristimanus Alcock, 1905
- Diogenes biramus Morgan, 1987
- Diogenes brevirostris Stimpson, 1858
- Diogenes canaliculatus Komai, Reshmi & Kumar, 2013
- Diogenes capricorneus Grant & McCulloch, 1906
- Diogenes costatus Henderson, 1893
- Diogenes crosnieri Dechancé, 1964
- Diogenes custos (Fabricius, 1798)
- Diogenes deflectomanus Wang & Tung, 1980
- Diogenes denticulatus Chevreux & Bouvier, 1891
- Diogenes dorotheae Morgan, 1991
- Diogenes dubius (Herbst, 1804)
- Diogenes edwardsii (DeHaan, 1849)
- Diogenes extricatus Stebbing, 1910
- Diogenes fasciatus Rahayu & Forest, 1995
- Diogenes foresti Rahayu & Hortle, 2002
- Diogenes goniochirus Forest, 1956
- Diogenes granulatus Miers, 1880
- Diogenes guttatus Henderson, 1888
- Diogenes heteropsammicola Momoko Igawa & Makoto Kato 2017
- Diogenes inglei McLaughlin & Clark, 1997
- Diogenes investigatoris Alcock, 1905
- Diogenes izananiae Asakura, 2006
- Diogenes jousseaumei (Bouvier, 1897)
- Diogenes jubatus (Nobili, 1903)
- Diogenes karwarensis Nayak & Neelakantan, 1989
- Diogenes klaasi Rahayu & Forest, 1995
- Diogenes laevicarpus Rahayu, 1996
- Diogenes lanaris Yap-Chiongco, 1937
- Diogenes leptocerus Forest, 1957
- Diogenes lophochir Morgan, 1989
- Diogenes maclaughlinae Nayak & Neelakantan, 1985
- Diogenes manaarensis (Henderson, 1893)
- Diogenes mercatoris Forest, 1952
- Diogenes merguiensis De Man, 1888
- Diogenes miles (Fabricius, 1787)
- Diogenes mixtus Lanchester, 1902
- Diogenes moosai Rahayu & Forest, 1995
- Diogenes nitidimanus Terao, 1913
- Diogenes ortholepis Forest, 1961
- Diogenes ovatus Miers, 1881
- Diogenes pallescens Whitelegge, 1897
- Diogenes paracristimanus Wang & Dong, 1977
- Diogenes patae Asakura & Godwin, 2006
- Diogenes penicillatus Stimpson, 1858
- Diogenes persicus (Nobili, 1905)
- Diogenes planimanus Henderson, 1893
- Diogenes pugilator (Roux, 1829)
- Diogenes rectimanus Miers, 1884
- Diogenes senex Heller, 1865
- Diogenes singaporensis Rahayu, 2015
- Diogenes spinicarpus Rahayu & Forest, 1995
- Diogenes spinifrons (De Haan, 1849)
- Diogenes tirmiziae Siddiqui & McLaughlin, 2003
- Diogenes tomentosus Wang & Tung, 1980
- Diogenes tumidus Rahayu & Forest, 1995
- Diogenes violaceus Henderson, 1893
- Diogenes viridis Haig & Ball, 1988
- Diogenes waltairensis Kamalaveni, 1950
