= Pseudopaguristes =

Scientific classification
- Domain: Eukaryota
- Kingdom: Animalia
- Phylum: Arthropoda
- Class: Malacostraca
- Order: Decapoda
- Suborder: Pleocyemata
- Infraorder: Anomura
- Family: Diogenidae
- Genus: Pseudopaguristes; McLaughlin, 2002

Genus of crustaceans

Pseudopaguristes is a genus of hermit crabs in the family Diogenidae.

== Species ==
Species placed by the WoRMS.

- Pseudopaguristes araeos Rahayu, 2007
- Pseudopaguristes asper Rahayu, 2005
- Pseudopaguristes bicolor Asakura & Kosuge, 2004
- Pseudopaguristes bollandi Asakura & McLaughlin, 2003
- Pseudopaguristes calliopsis Forest & de Saint Laurent, 1968
- Pseudopaguristes hians Henderson, 1888
- Pseudopaguristes invisisacculus McLaughlin & Provenzano, 1974
- Pseudopaguristes janetkae McLaughlin, 2002
- Pseudopaguristes kuekenthali de Man, 1902
- Pseudopaguristes laurentae Morgan & Forest, 1991
- Pseudopaguristes marocanus A. Milne-Edwards & Bouvier, 1892
- Pseudopaguristes mclaughlinae Rahayu, 2008
- Pseudopaguristes monoporus Morgan, 1987
- Pseudopaguristes pachydactylus Rahayu, 2008
- Pseudopaguristes shidarai Asakura, 2004
