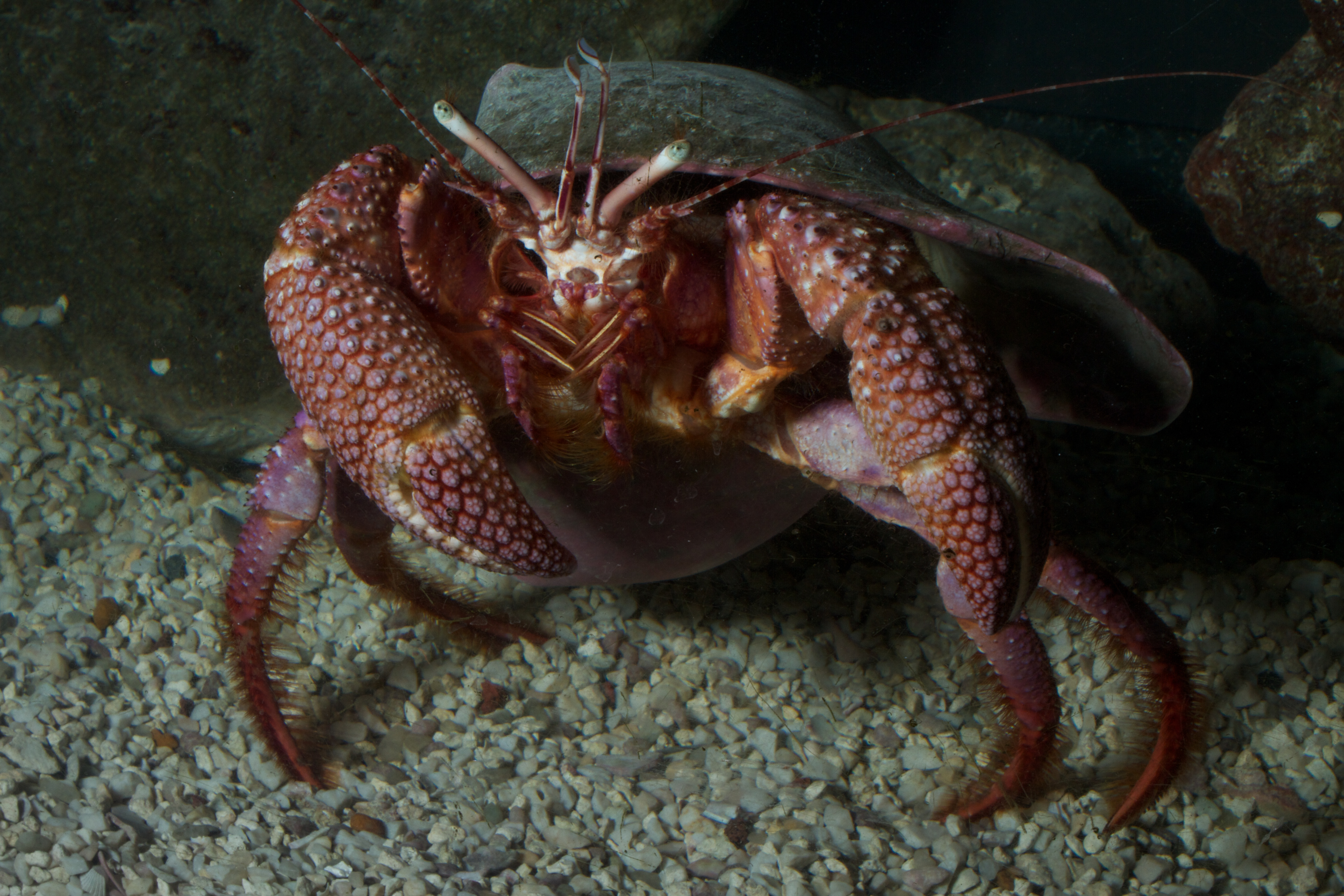
- Petrochirus diogenes

Scientific classification
- Kingdom: Animalia
- Phylum: Arthropoda
- Clade: Pancrustacea
- Class: Malacostraca
- Order: Decapoda
- Suborder: Pleocyemata
- Infraorder: Anomura
- Family: Diogenidae
- Genus: Petrochirus; Stimpson, 1858

= Petrochirus =

Genus of crustacean

Petrochirus is a genus of hermit crabs of the family Diogenidae. There are seven described species of the genus. The genus was described by William Stimpson in 1858.
