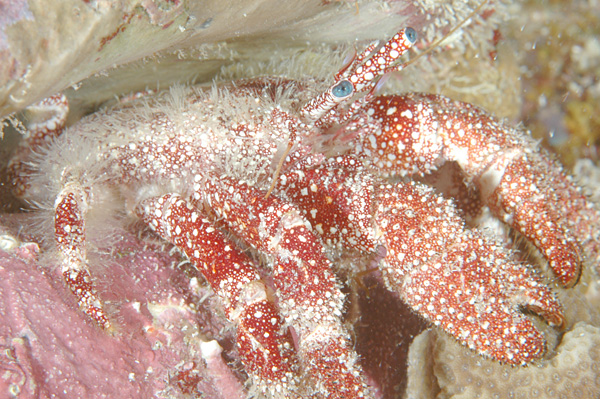
- Paguristes puncticeps

Scientific classification
- Domain: Eukaryota
- Kingdom: Animalia
- Phylum: Arthropoda
- Class: Malacostraca
- Order: Decapoda
- Suborder: Pleocyemata
- Infraorder: Anomura
- Family: Diogenidae
- Genus: Paguristes; Dana, 1852

Type species
- Paguristes weddellii (H. Milne-Edwards, 1848)

= Paguristes =

Genus of crustaceans

Paguristes is a genus of hermit crab in the family Diogenidae. It includes the following species (extinct species are marked with a †):

- P. acanthomerus Ortmann, 1892
- P. aciculus Grant, 1905
- P. agulhasensis Forest, 1954
- P. albimaculatus Komai, 2001
- P. alcocki McLaughlin & Rahayu, 2005
- P. alegrias Morgan, 1987
- P. anahuacus Glassell, 1938
- P. angustithecus McLaughlin & Provenzano, 1974
- P. anomalus Bouvier, 1918
- P. antennarius Rahayu, 2006
- P. arostratus Rahayu, 2006
- P. aulacis Rahayu & Forest, 2009
- P. aztatlanensis Glassell, 1937
- P. bakeri Holmes, 1900
- P. balanophilus Alcock, 1905
- P. barbatus (Heller, 1862)
- P. barnardi Forest, 1954
- P. brachyrostris Rahayu, 2006
- P. brevicornis (Guérin-Méneville, 1830)
- P. brevirostris Baker, 1905
- P. cadenati Forest, 1954
- P. calvus Alcock, 1905
- †P. chipolensis Rathbun, 1935
- P. ciliatus Heller, 1862
- P. crinitimanus McLaughlin, 2008
- †P. cserhatensis Muller, 1984
- P. dampierensis McLaughlin, 2008
- P. depressus Stimpson, 1859
- P. digitalis Stimpson, 1858
- P. digueti Bouvier, 1893
- P. doederleini Komai, 2001
- P. eremita (Linnaeus, 1767)
- P. erythrops Holthuis, 1959
- P. fagei Forest, 1952
- P. fecundus Faxon, 1893
- †P. florae Collins, Fraaye & Jagt, 1995
- P. foresti Scelzo, 1971
- P. frontalis H. Milne-Edwards, 1836
- P. gamianus (H. Milne-Edwards, 1836)
- P. geminatus McLaughlin, 2008
- P. gonagrus (H. Milne-Edwards, 1836)
- P. grayi (Benedict, 1901)
- P. hernancortezi McLaughlin & Provenzano, 1974
- †P. hokensis Schweitzer & Feldmann, 2001
- P. holguinensis Manjon-Cabeza, Garcia Raso & Martinez Iglesias, 2002
- †P. hungaricus (Lorenthey & Beurlen, 1929)
- P. incomitatus Alcock, 1905
- P. inconstans McLaughlin & Provenzano, 1975
- P. insularis Forest, 1966
- P. jalur Morgan, 1992
- †P. johnsoni Rathbun, 1935
- P. jousseaumei Bouvier, 1892
- P. kimberleyensis Morgan & Forest, 1991
- P. lapillatus McLaughlin & Provenzano, 1975
- P. laticlavus McLaughlin & Provenzano, 1975
- P. lauriei McLaughlin & Hogarth, 1998
- P. lewinsohni McLaughlin & Rahayu, 2005
- P. limonensis McLaughlin & Provenzano, 1975
- P. longirostris Dana, 1851
- P. longisetosus Morgan, 1987
- P. lymani A. Milne-Edwards & Bouvier, 1893
- P. maclaughlinae Martinez-Iglesias & Gomez, 1989
- P. macrotrichus Forest, 1954
- P. markhami Sandberg, 1996
- P. marocanus A. Milne-Edwards & Bouvier, 1891
- P. mauritanicus Bouvier, 1906
- P. meloi Nucci & Hebling, 2004
- †P. mexicanus Vega et al., 2001
- P. microphthalmus Forest, 1952
- P. microps Rahayu & Forest, 2009
- P. miyakei Forest & McLaughlin, 1998
- P. moorei Benedict, 1901
- P. mundus Alcock, 1905
- P. oculivolaceus Glassell, 1937
- †P. oligotuberculatus Muller & Collins, 1991
- P. ortmanni Miyake, 1978
- †P. ouachitensis Rathbun, 1935
- P. oxyacanthus Forest, 1952
- P. oxyophthalmus Holthuis, 1959
- P. palythophilus Ortmann, 1892
- P. paraguanensis McLaughlin & Provenzano, 1975
- P. parvus Holmes, 1900
- P. pauciparus Forest & de Saint Laurent, 1968
- P. perplexus McLaughlin & Provenzano, 1974
- P. perrieri Bouvier, 1895
- P. petalodactylus Rahayu, 2007
- P. planatus A. Milne-Edwards & Bouvier, 1893
- P. praedator Glassell, 1937
- P. pugil McCulloch, 1913
- P. puncticeps Benedict, 1901
- P. puniceus Henderson, 1896
- P. purpureantennatus Morgan, 1987
- P. pusillus Henderson, 1896
- P. robustus Forest & de Saint Laurent, 1968
- P. rostralis Forest & de Saint Laurent, 1968
- P. rubropictus A. Milne-Edwards & Bouvier, 1892
- P. runyanae Haig & Ball, 1988
- P. sanguinimanus Glassell, 1938
- P. sayi A. Milne-Edwards & Bouvier, 1893
- P. seminudus Stimpson, 1858
- P. sericeus A. Milne-Edwards, 1880
- P. simplex Rahayu & McLaughlin, 2006
- P. sinensis Tung & Wang, 1966
- P. skoogi Odhner, 1923
- P. spectabilis McLaughlin & Provenzano, 1975
- P. spinipes A. Milne-Edwards, 1880
- P. squamosus McCulloch, 1913
- P. starki Provenzano, 1965
- P. streaensis Pastore, 1984
- †P. subequalis Rathbun, 1926
- P. subpilosus Henderson, 1888
- †P. substriatiformis Lorenthey & Beurlen, 1929
- P. sulcatus Baker, 1905
- P. syrtensis De Saint Laurent, 1971
- P. tomentosus (H. Milne-Edwards, 1848)
- P. tortugae Schmitt, 1933
- P. triangulatus A. Milne-Edwards & Bouvier, 1893
- P. triangulopsis Forest & de Saint Laurent, 1968
- P. triton McLaughlin, 2008
- P. turgidus (Stimpson, 1857)
- P. ulreyi Schmitt, 1921
- P. versus Komai, 2001
- P. wassi Provenzano, 1961
- P. weddellii (H. Milne-Edwards, 1848)
- P. werdingi Campos & Sanchez, 1995
- †P. wheeleri Blow & Manning, 1996
- †P. whitteni Bishop, 1983
- P. zebra Campos & Sanchez, 1995
- P. zhejiangensis Wang & Tung, 1982
