= Paguropsis =

Scientific classification
- Kingdom: Animalia
- Phylum: Arthropoda
- Clade: Pancrustacea
- Class: Malacostraca
- Order: Decapoda
- Suborder: Pleocyemata
- Infraorder: Anomura
- Family: Diogenidae
- Genus: Paguropsis; Henderson, 1888

Genus of crustaceans

Paguropsis is a genus of hermit crabs in the family Diogenidae.

== Species ==
- Paguropsis confusa Lemaitre, Rahayu & Komai, 2018
- Paguropsis gigas Lemaitre, Rahayu & Komai, 2018
- Paguropsis lacinia Lemaitre, Rahayu & Komai, 2018
- Paguropsis typica Henderson, 1888
