= Joecalcinus =

Joecalcinus Temporal range: Early Eocene

Scientific classification
- Kingdom: Animalia
- Phylum: Arthropoda
- Clade: Pancrustacea
- Class: Malacostraca
- Order: Decapoda
- Suborder: Pleocyemata
- Infraorder: Anomura
- Family: Diogenidae
- Genus: †Joecalcinus
- Species: †J. bolcensis

Binomial name
- †Joecalcinus bolcensis Fraaije et al., 2020

Extinct genus of hermit crabs

Joecalcinus is an extinct genus of diogenid that lived during the Eocene epoch.

== Distribution ==
Joecalcinus bolcensis was found in the Lessini Mountains of northern Italy.
