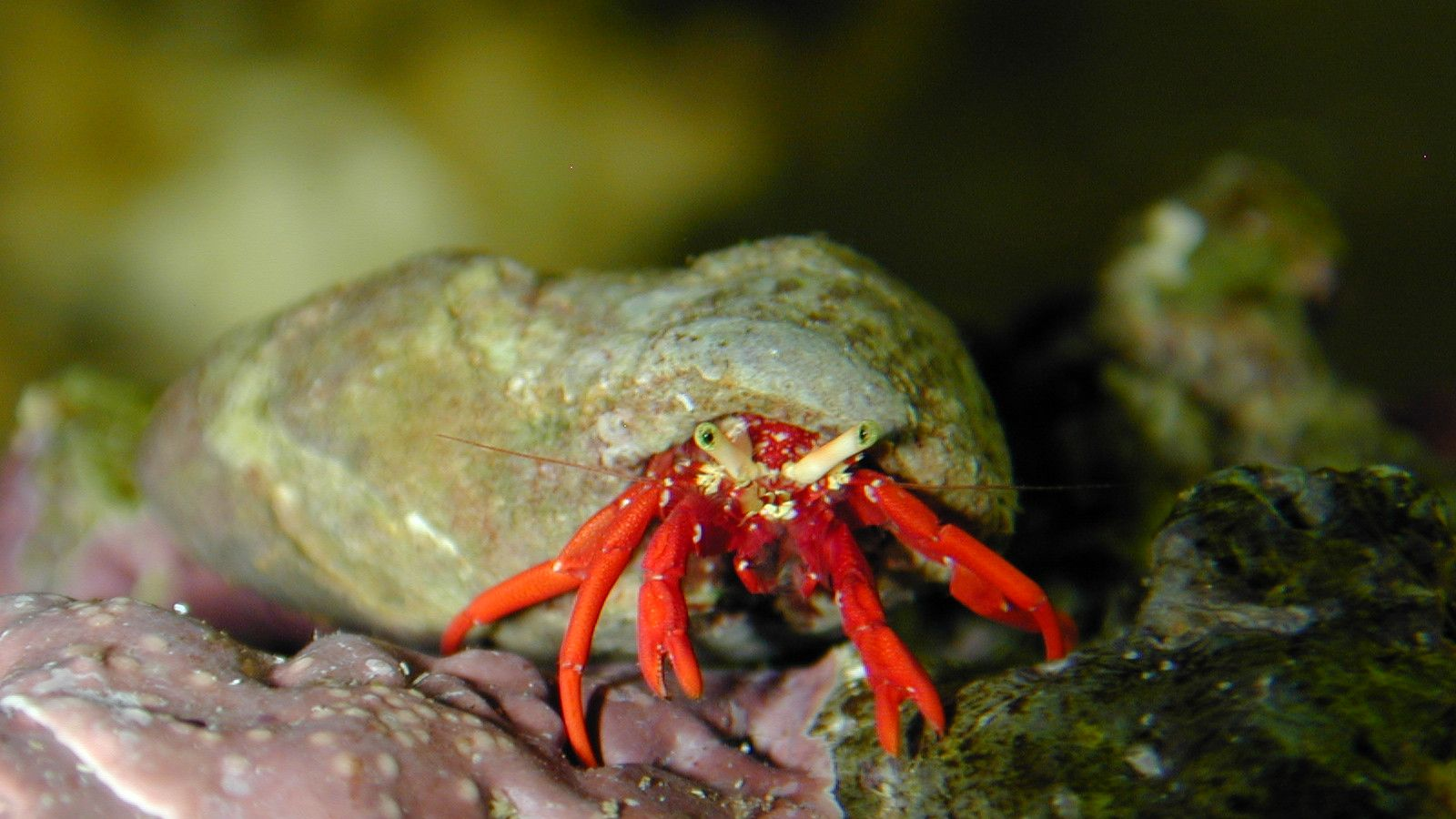

Scientific classification
- Domain: Eukaryota
- Kingdom: Animalia
- Phylum: Arthropoda
- Class: Malacostraca
- Order: Decapoda
- Suborder: Pleocyemata
- Infraorder: Anomura
- Family: Diogenidae
- Genus: Paguristes
- Species: P. cadenati

Binomial name
- Paguristes cadenati Forest, 1954

= Paguristes cadenati =

Species of hermit crab of the Caribbean

Paguristes cadenati, the red reef hermit crab or scarlet hermit crab, is a small (about 3 centimetres or 1.2 inches across) species of hermit crab with a bright red body and yellow eyestalks that lives in the Caribbean Sea. The specific name honours the French ichthyologist Jean Cadenat (1908-1992), who collected the type specimen and sent it to the French carcinologist Jacques Forest, who described it as a new species.

== Description ==
The red reef hermit crab grows to a length of about 3 cm (1.2 in). The limbs and chelae (pincers) are smooth and hairless, and the left chela is slightly larger than the right one; the abdomen is unarmoured and is concealed in the recesses of the gastropod mollusc shell that protects it. The general colour of this hermit crab is bright red with the exception of the antennae, which are deep red, and the elongated eyestalks, which are yellow or yellowish-orange. The corneas of the eyes are yellowish-green. It could be confused with the orange-claw hermit crab (Calcinus tibicen) which is similar in size, but that species is generally darker in colour and has white patches near the tips of its limbs.

== Distribution and habitat ==
This hermit crab is native to the Gulf of Mexico and the Caribbean Sea, its range including southern Florida and the West Indies. It occurs on coral reefs at depths ranging from the intertidal zone down to about 80 m (260 ft).

== Ecology ==
The red reef hermit crab is a scavenger, feeding on animal and vegetable detritus. The sexes are separate in this species and it breeds throughout the year. The eggs are orange and hatch into planktonic larvae. When these settle on the seabed, the juvenile hermit crabs need to search for a suitable shell to occupy. They often inhabit the empty shells of Cerithium species and Vasum species.

This hermit crab is suitable for inclusion in an invertebrate-friendly reef aquarium where it consumes algae, including filamentous, hair, and slime algae, as well as cyanobacteria and is useful in keeping the tank clean.
