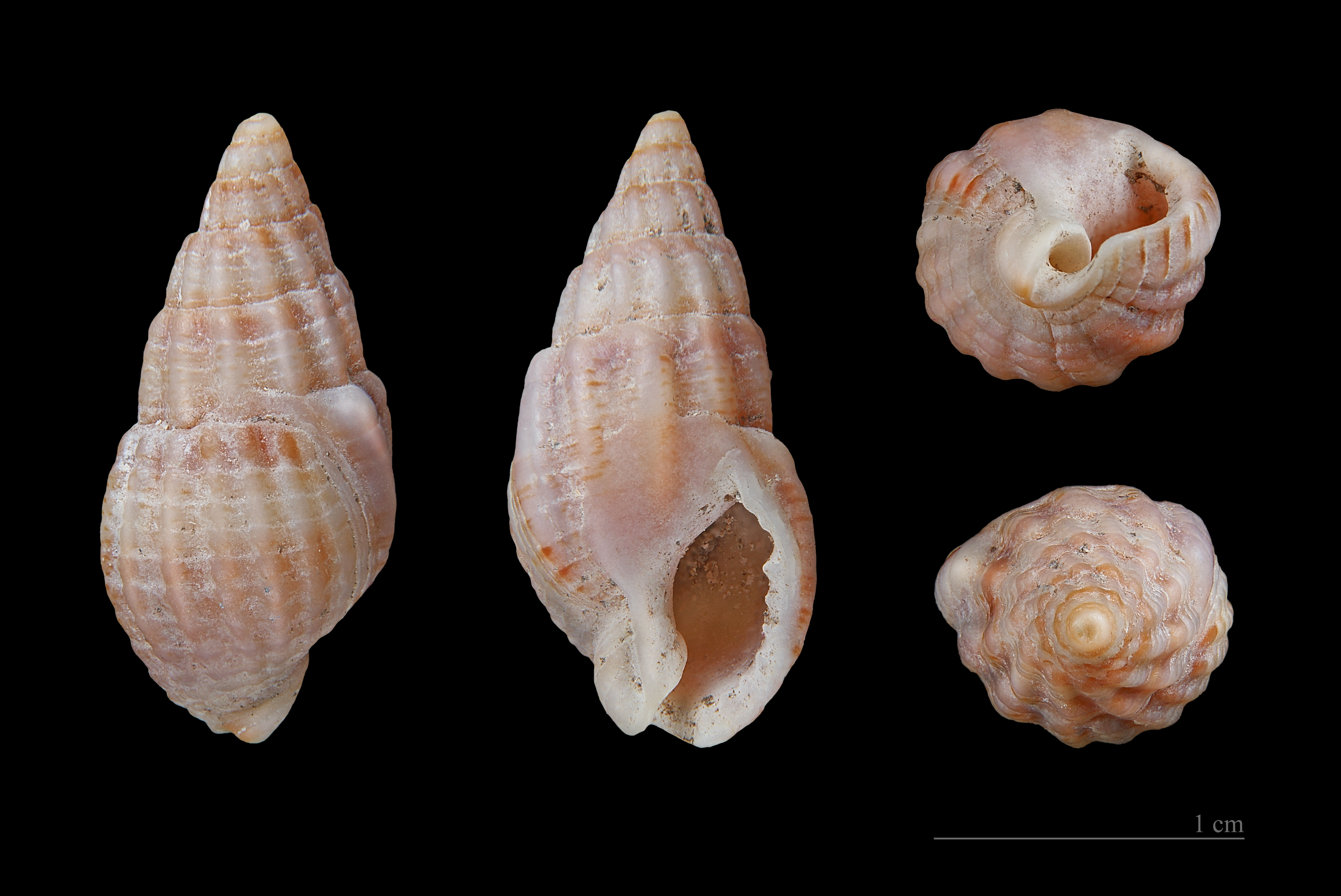
- Tritia reticulata - MHNT

Scientific classification
- Kingdom: Animalia
- Phylum: Mollusca
- Class: Gastropoda
- Subclass: Caenogastropoda
- Order: Neogastropoda
- Family: Nassariidae
- Genus: Tritia
- Species: T. reticulata

Binomial name
- Tritia reticulata (Linnaeus, 1758)

Synonyms
- Buccinum anglicum Röding 1798; Buccinum chrysostomum Röding 1798; Buccinum marginulatum Lamarck 1822 (doubtful synonym); Buccinum porcatum Röding 1798 (doubtful synonym); Buccinum reticulatum Linnaeus, 1758 (original combination); Buccinum vulgatum Gmelin 1791 (doubtful synonym); Hinia reticulata (Linnaeus, 1758); Nassa bourguignati Locard 1887; Nassa cancellata Mörch 1853; Nassa cancellata Martens 1870; Nassa coronata Nobre 1884; Nassa isomera Locard 1886; Nassa limicola Martens 1870; Nassa minor Marshall 1893; Nassa oblonga Mörch 1853 (doubtful synonym); Nassa poirieri Locard 1887; Nassa reticulata (Linnaeus, 1758); Nassa (Hinia) reticulata var. viriditincta Dautzenberg & Fischer H. 1925; Nassarius (Hinia) reticulata (Linnaeus, 1758); Nassarius reticulatus (Linnaeus, 1758)

= Tritia reticulata =

Species of gastropod

Tritia reticulata, commonly known as the netted dog whelk, is a species of small European sea snail, a marine gastropod mollusc in the family Nassariidae, the dog whelks or nassa mud snails.

== Description ==
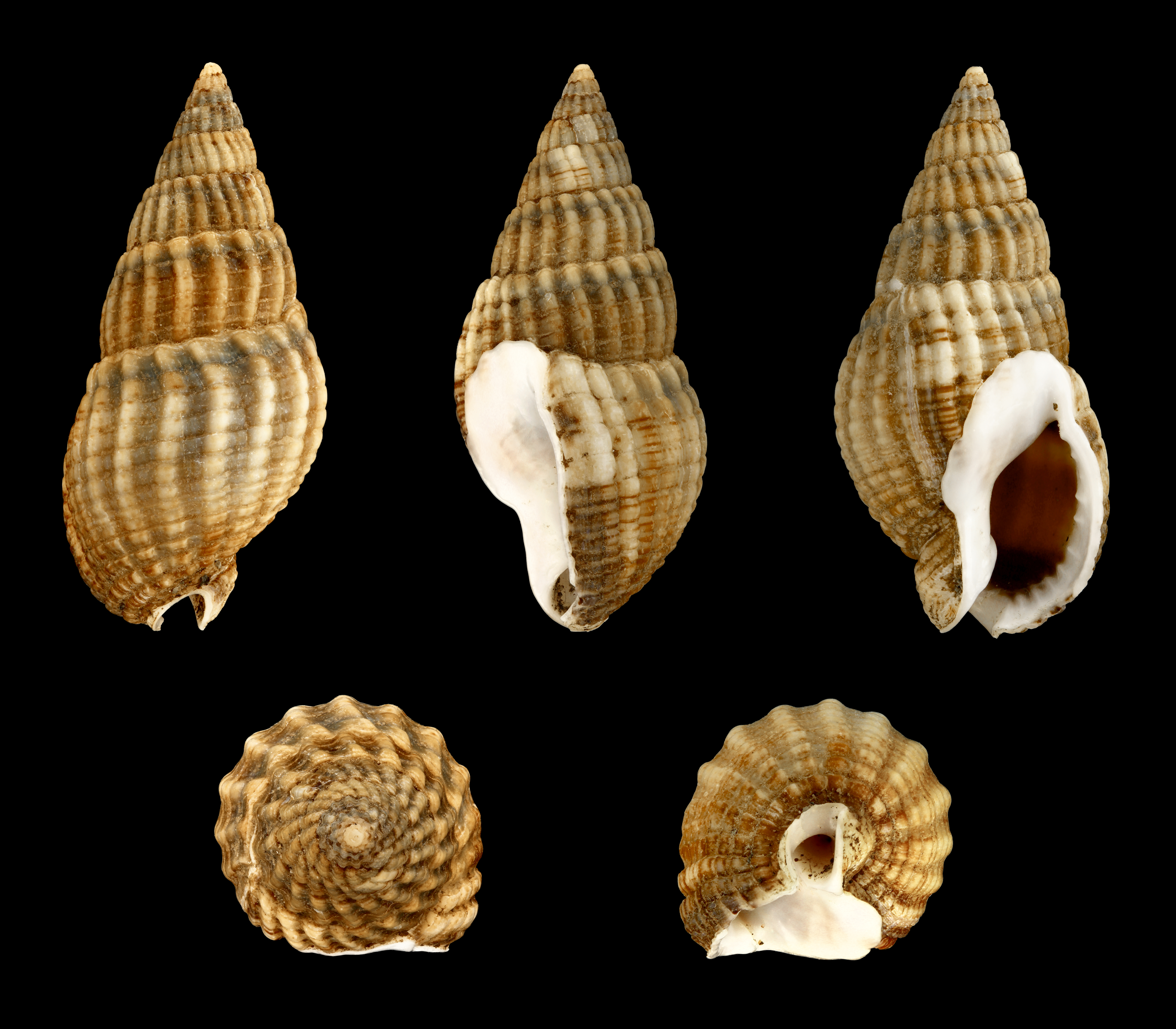
Shell of a recent specimen from the Mediterranean

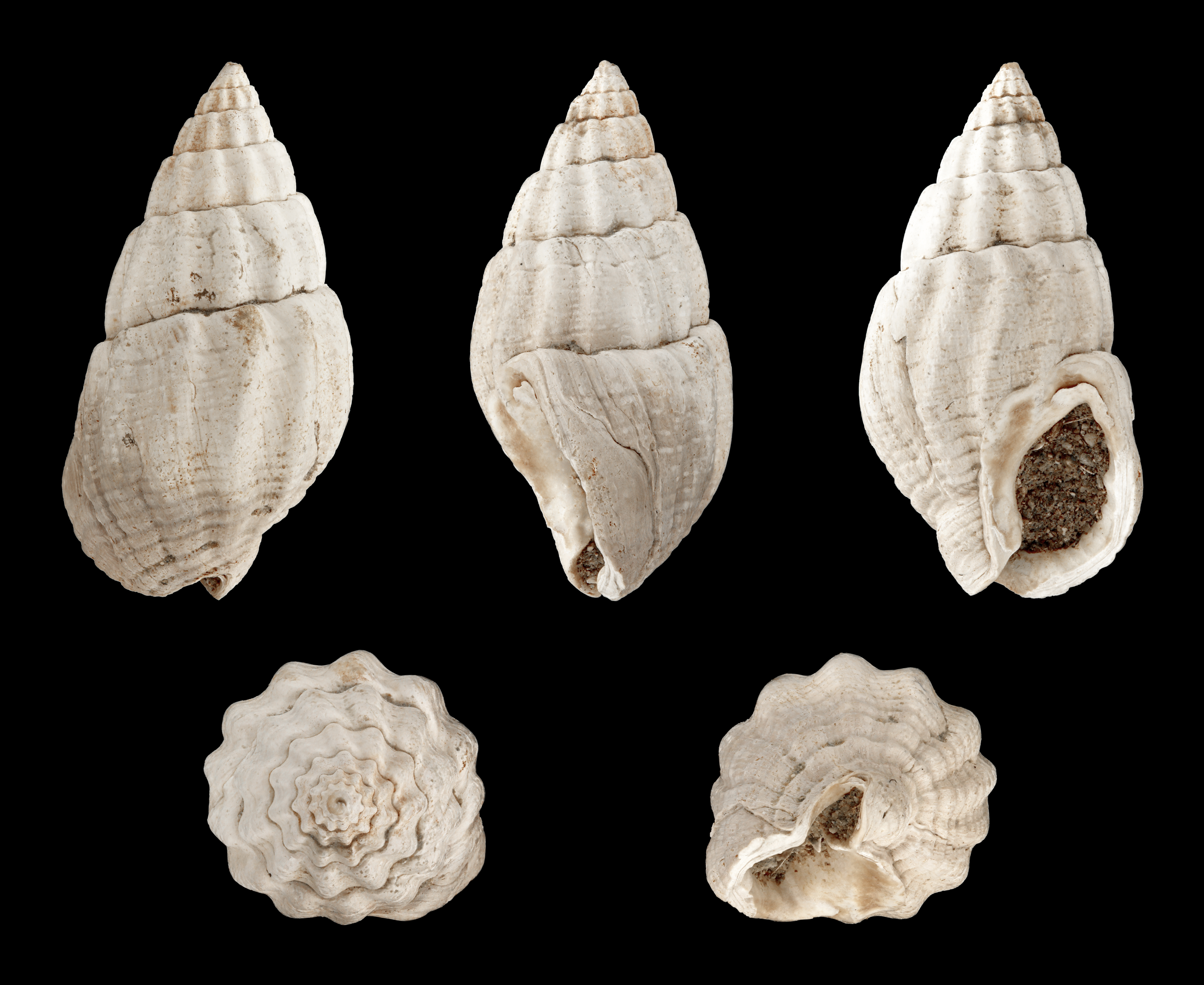
Shell of a fossil specimen from the Pliocene of Italy

The length of the shell varies between 20 mm and 35 mm.

The egg-shaped shell is elongated, rounded, obtuse at its lower extremity, and pointed at the upper extremity. It is moderately thick. The conical spire is composed of eight or nine whorls, almost flat, or slightly swollen, but distant from each other. Their surface is deeply chequered by longitudinal folds, crossed by numerous striae. The aperture is moderate, white and ovate. The outer lip is thick, ornamented within with seven or eight striae, of which those of the middle are generally the largest. The columella is slightly arcuated, covered with a thin, brilliant plate. The color of this shell is of a yellowish white, reddish or chestnut-color, with a blackish blue band, passing beneath the suture.

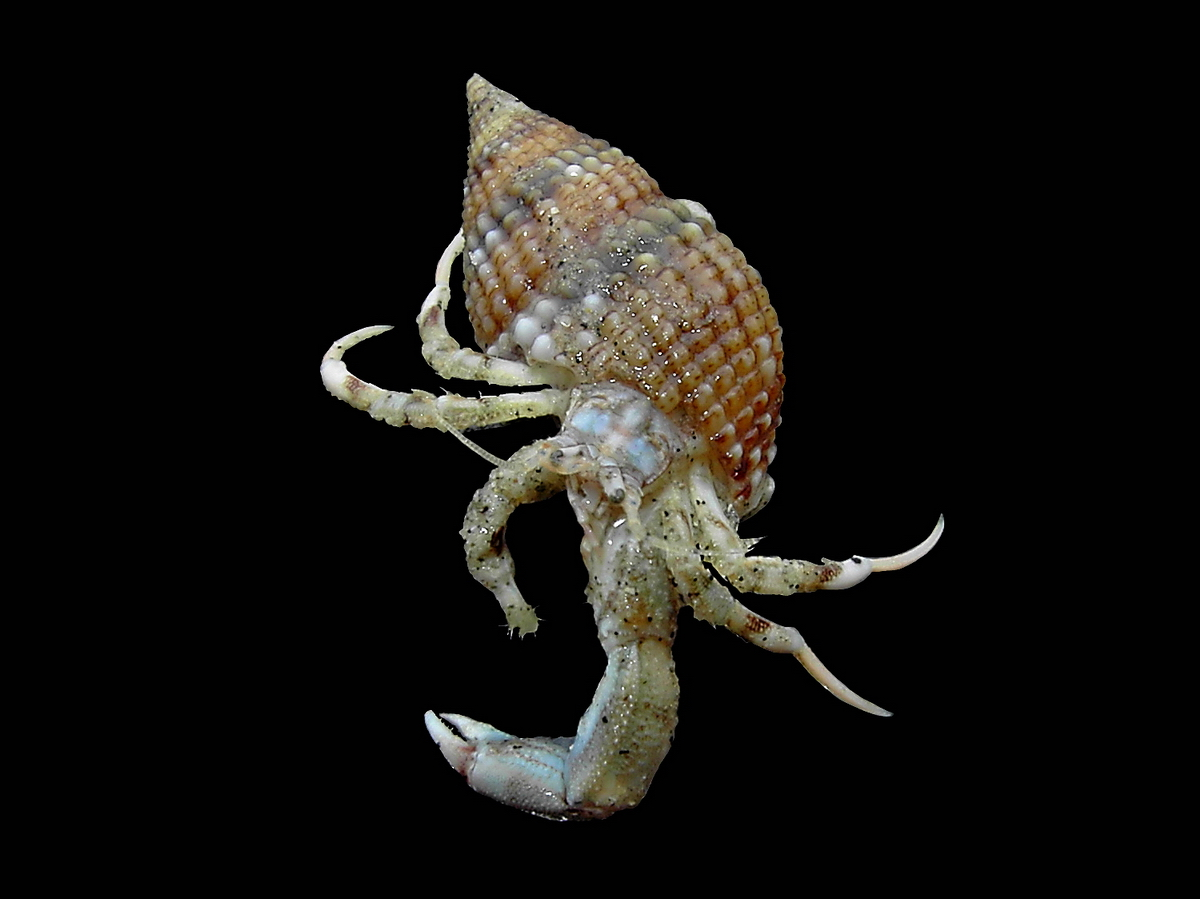
Hermit crab Diogenes pugilator, using a shell of the dog whelk Nassarius reticulatus

== Distribution ==
This species occurs in the Northeast Atlantic, in European waters, in the Atlantic Ocean off the Azores, the Canary Islands, Cape Verde Islands and Morocco.
