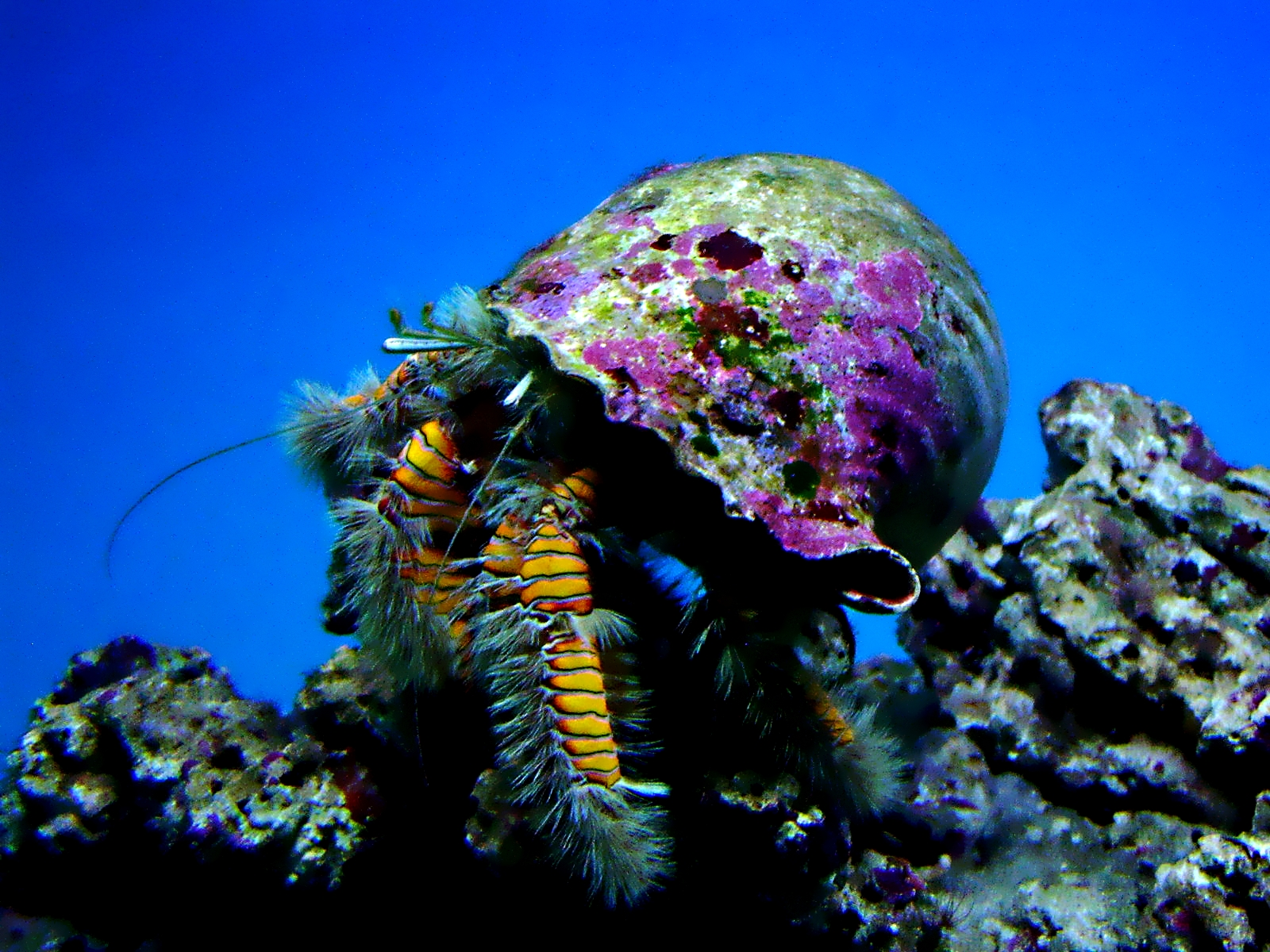
- Hairy yellow hermit crab (Aniculus maximus)

Scientific classification
- Kingdom: Animalia
- Phylum: Arthropoda
- Clade: Pancrustacea
- Class: Malacostraca
- Order: Decapoda
- Suborder: Pleocyemata
- Infraorder: Anomura
- Family: Diogenidae
- Genus: Aniculus; Dana, 1852

= Aniculus =

Genus of crustacean

Aniculus is a genus of aquatic hermit crab of the family Diogenidae.

== Species ==
The following species are currently accepted within Aniculus:

- Aniculus aniculus (J. C. Fabricius, 1787)
- Aniculus elegans Stimpson, 1858
- Aniculus erythraeus Forest, 1984
- Aniculus hopperae McLaughlin & Hoover, 1996
- Aniculus maximus Edmondson, 1952
- Aniculus miyakei Forest, 1984
- Aniculus retipes Lewinsohn, 1982
- Aniculus sibogae Forest, 1984
- Aniculus ursus (Olivier, 1812)
