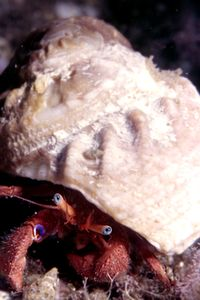

Scientific classification
- Kingdom: Animalia
- Phylum: Arthropoda
- Class: Malacostraca
- Order: Decapoda
- Suborder: Pleocyemata
- Infraorder: Anomura
- Family: Diogenidae
- Genus: Paguristes
- Species: P. eremita

Binomial name
- Paguristes eremita (Linnaeus, 1767)

Synonyms
- Cancer eremita Linnaeus, 1767; Paguristes maculatus (Risso, 1827); Paguristes oculatus (Fabricius, 1775); Pagurus maculatus Risso, 1827; Pagurus oculatus Fabricius, 1775

= Paguristes eremita =

Species of crustacean

Paguristes eremita, the eye spot hermit crab, is a species of hermit crab in the family Diogenidae. It is found in the Mediterranean Sea.

== Description ==
The carapace of this hermit crab can grow to a length of about 20 mm (0.8 in). The rostrum is pointed and there is a spine at the tip of the small eye scale. The eye stalks are long and cylindrical and the antennal scales are thorny and nearly cover the bases of the antennae. The chelae (claws) are granulated and covered with short hairs. The left chela is slightly larger than the right one. The walking legs are laterally compressed; the first three pairs are similar in length, the fourth pair are much shorter and the fifth pair end in small claws. The general colour of this crab is orange-red to brown, and the eyes are greyish-blue. A purplish spot at the base of the dactylus is diagnostic of this species.

== Distribution and habitat ==
Paguristes eremita is native to the Mediterranean Sea and adjoining Atlantic Ocean, where its range extends from Portugal to Morocco. Its depth range is 10 to 50 m (33 to 164 ft) and it occurs on sandy stretches of seabed and in seagrass meadows among the Neptune grass.

== Ecology ==
Like other hermit crabs, P. eremita inhabits the empty shell of a gastropod mollusc. It is often associated with the sea anemone Calliactis parasitica, epizoanthids, hydroids or the sponge Suberites domuncula which attach themselves to the shell. The main predators on this crab are loggerhead turtles, larger crustaceans, octopuses and certain fish.

Like other crabs, P. eremita is a detritivore. Breeding takes place all year round. The larvae are planktonic and pass through two zoea larval stages and one megalopa stage before undergoing metamorphosis into juvenile hermit crabs.
