= Camill Heller =

Czech zoologist and anatomist (1823–1917)

Camill Heller (26 September 1823 – 25 February 1917) was a zoologist and anatomist.

Heller was born in Sobochleben (Soběchleby) near Teplitz in Bohemia (now Teplice, part of the Czech Republic). He received a doctorate in medical studies in Vienna in 1849. Heller was the 'Professor of Zoology and Comparative Anatomy' at the University of Krakow in Poland from 1858 to 1863 and from 1863 until his retirement in 1894 he taught at the University of Innsbruck in Austria.

Heller primarily specialised in crustaceans but also worked on bryozoans, echinoderms, pycnogonids, and tunicates.

== Taxa named by Camill Heller ==
Category:Taxa named by Camill Heller
