= Patsy Ann McLaughlin =

American carcinologist

- Born: May 27, 1932; Seattle, Washington, U.S.
- Died: April 4, 2011 (aged 78)
- Other name: Pat McLaughlin
- Education: George Washington University
- Scientific career
- Thesis: The hermit crabs of the genus Pagurus (Crustacea: Decapoda: Paguridae) from northwestern North America, with a partial revision of the genus. (1972)

Patsy Ann McLaughlin (27 May 1932 – 4 April 2011), was an American carcinologist and was regarded as one of the most influential scientists in her field. The crab genus Patagurus was named in her honor in 2013.

== Early life and education ==
McLaughlin was born in Seattle on May 27, 1932 to Edna Pearl Lessenger and Elmer Robert McLaughlin. She attended both Palo Alto Junior and Senior High School and graduated in 1946. She went on to attend both the University of Utah and the University of Washington, but did not obtain a degree. After serving in the United States Air Force, McLaughlin returned to tertiary education again attending the University of Washington, Seattle where Dixie Lee Ray encouraged her to consider studying the natural sciences.

In 1957, McLaughlin, majoring in zoology, obtained a Bachelor of Arts degree. McLaughlin went on to obtain her PhD. from George Washington University in 1972. Her doctoral dissertation was titled The hermit crabs of the genus Pagurus (Crustacea: Decapoda: Paguridae) from northwestern North America, with a partial revision of the genus. Her thesis was regarded by a fellow carcinologist as "a phenomenal work that still stands as one of the most indispensable, and beautifully illustrated single works on the taxonomy of these decapods".

== Career ==
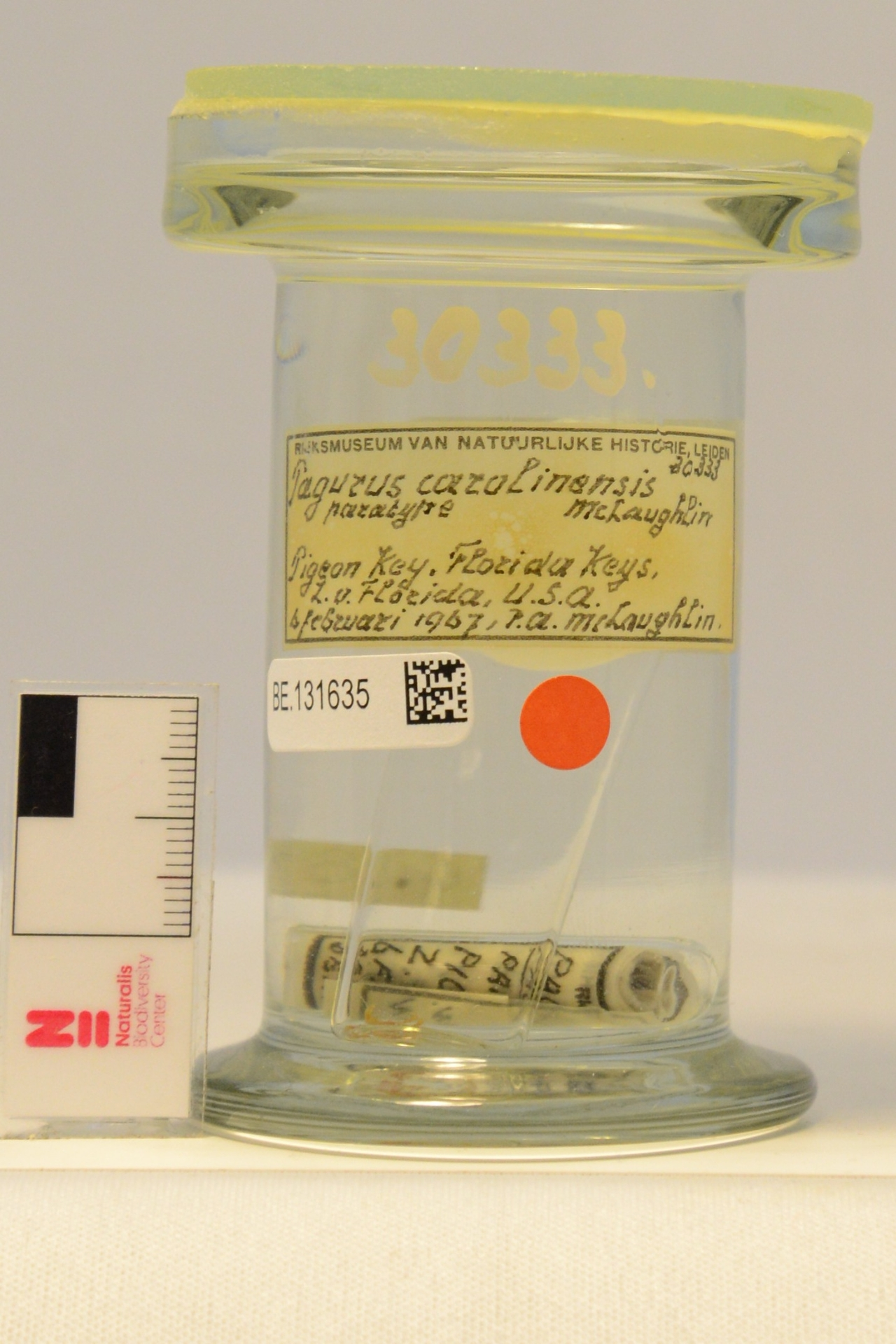
A specimen of Pagurus carolinensis collected and identified by McLaughlin

She was employed from 1957 to 1960 as a fishery biologist at the Seattle Biological Laboratory at the Bureau of Commercial Fisheries. From 1960 to 1963 she became an assistant zoologist at the Department of Oceanography at the University of Washington. She moved to Washington, D.C. in 1965 and was employed as the supervisor for invertebrates at the Smithsonian Oceanographic Sorting Center, Smithsonian Institution until 1968.

From 1969 until 1973 McLaughlin worked as a research assistant, and went on to become a research associate, at the Rosenstiel School of Marine and Atmospheric Science at the University of Miami. From 1975 McLaughlin obtained a position as a research scientist and was also a courtesy professor at the Department of Biological Sciences, Florida International University. She stayed at Florida International University until 1987 when she took an unpaid position in the Shannon Point Marine Center at Western Washington University as a visiting scientist and adjunct professor. She remained at Western Washington University until her death.

== Death and honours ==
McLaughlin died on the 4th of April 2011 and her ashes were placed in Fidalgo Bay, Washington. The crab genus Patagurus was named in her honor in 2013. Her archives are held at the Smithsonian Institution Archives.

== Selected publications ==
- McLaughlin, Patsy A.; Gilchrist, Sandra (2020-08-26), "Women's contributions to carcinology", History of Carcinology (1 ed.), CRC Press, pp. 165–206, doi:10.1201/9781003077633-11, ISBN 978-1-00-307763-3, S2CID 225271871
