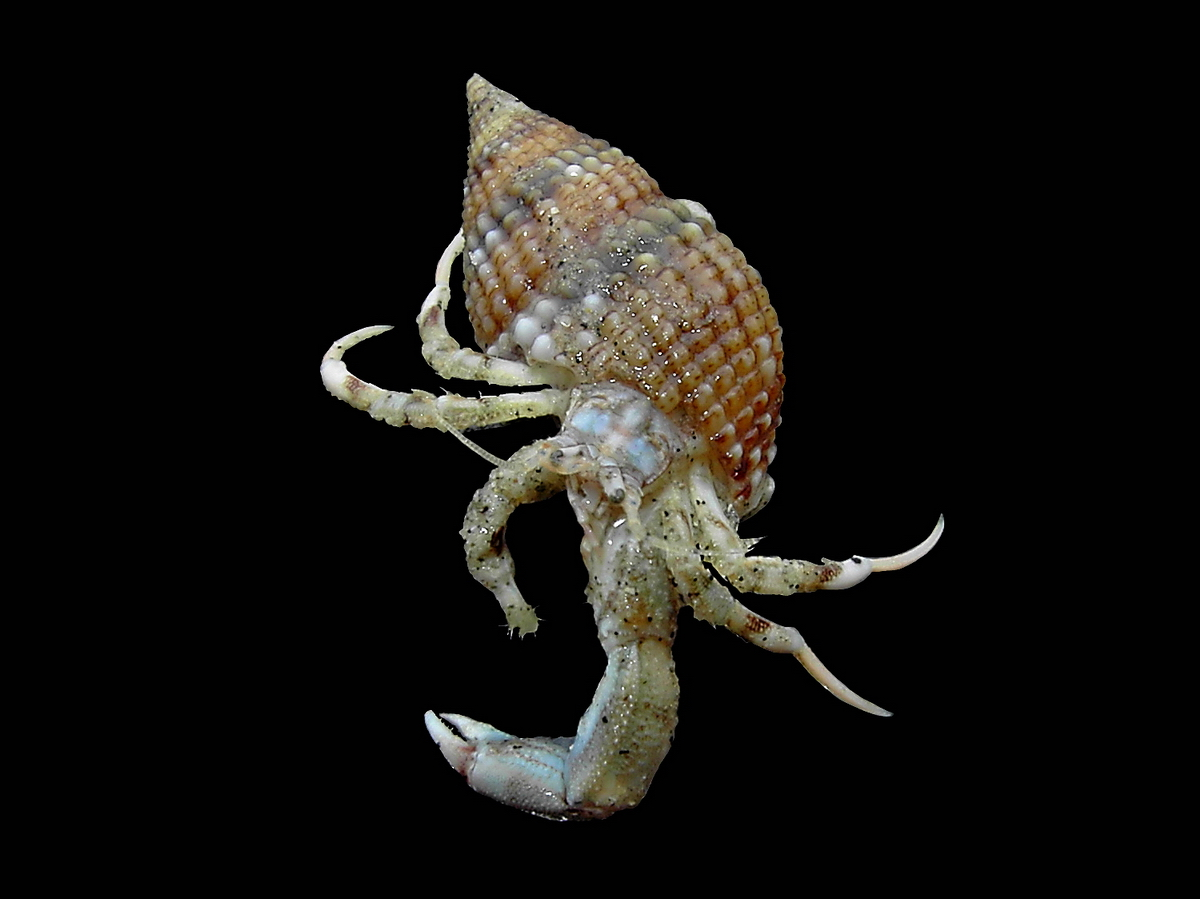
- Diogenes pugilator

Scientific classification
- Kingdom: Animalia
- Phylum: Arthropoda
- Clade: Pancrustacea
- Class: Malacostraca
- Order: Decapoda
- Suborder: Pleocyemata
- Infraorder: Anomura
- Superfamily: Paguroidea
- Family: Diogenidae; Ortmann, 1892

= Diogenidae =

Family of crustaceans

The Diogenidae are a family of hermit crabs, sometimes known as "left-handed hermit crabs" because in contrast to most other hermit crabs, its left chela (claw) is enlarged instead of the right. It comprises 429 extant species, and a further 47 extinct species, making it the second-largest family of marine hermit crabs, after the Paguridae.

== Genera ==
- Allodardanus Haig & Provenzano, 1965
- Aniculus Dana, 1852
- Areopaguristes Rahayu & McLaughlin, 2010
- †Annuntidiogenes Fraaije, Van Bakel, Jagt & Artal, 2008
- Bathynarius Forest, 1989
- Calcinus Dana, 1851
- Cancellus H. Milne-Edwards, 1836
- Ciliopagurus Forest, 1995
- Clibanarius Dana, 1852
- Dardanus Paul'son, 1875
- Diogenes Dana, 1851
- †Eocalcinus Vía, 1959
- Isocheles Stimpson, 1858
- †Joecalcinus Fraaije et al., 2020
- Loxopagurus Forest, 1964
- Paguristes Dana, 1851
- Paguropsis Henderson, 1888
- †Parapaguristes Bishop, 1986
- Petrochirus Stimpson, 1858
- Pseudopaguristes McLaughlin, 2002
- Pseudopagurus Forest, 1952
- Stratiotes Thomson, 1899 – see Areopaguristes
- †Striadiogenes Garassino, De Angeli & Pasini, 2009
- Strigopagurus Forest, 1995
- Tisea Morgan & Forest, 1991
- Trizopagurus Forest, 1952
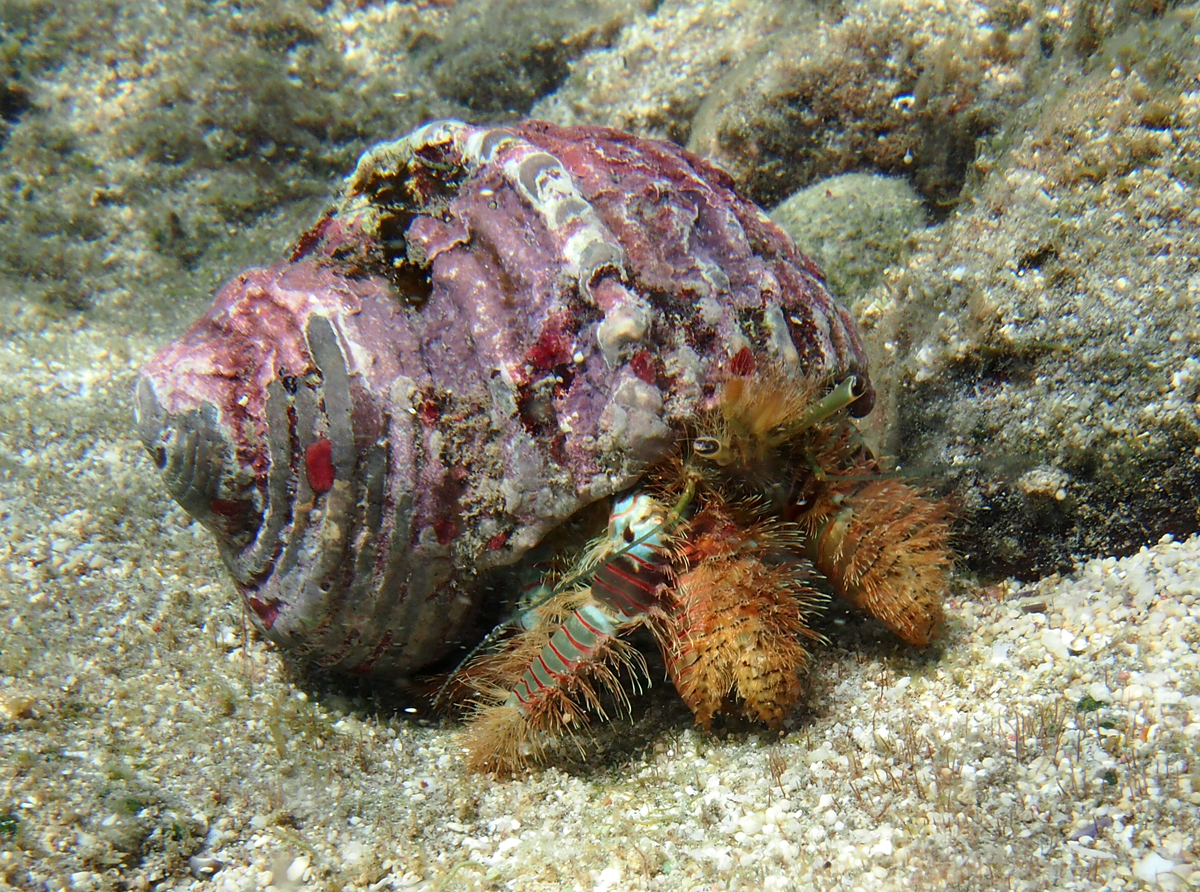
Aniculus ursus

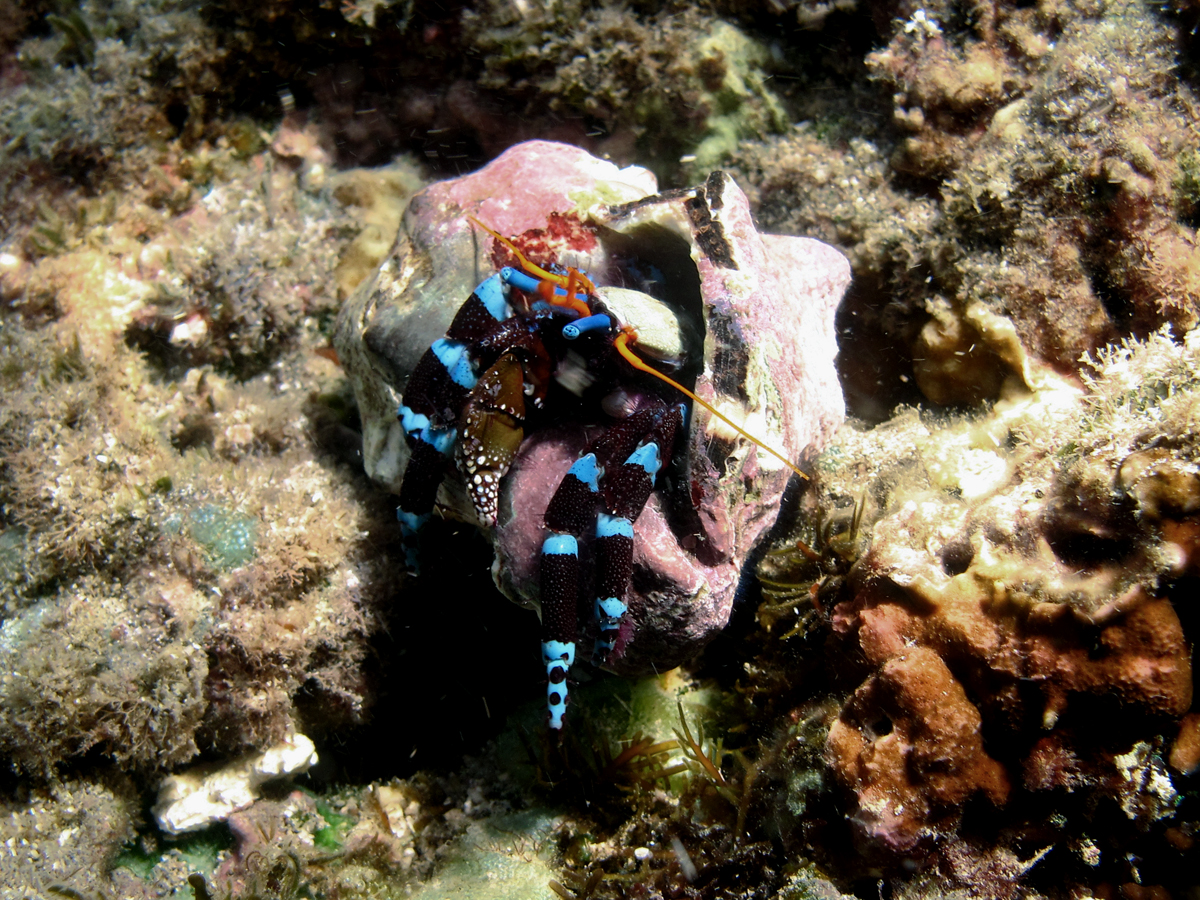
Calcinus elegans

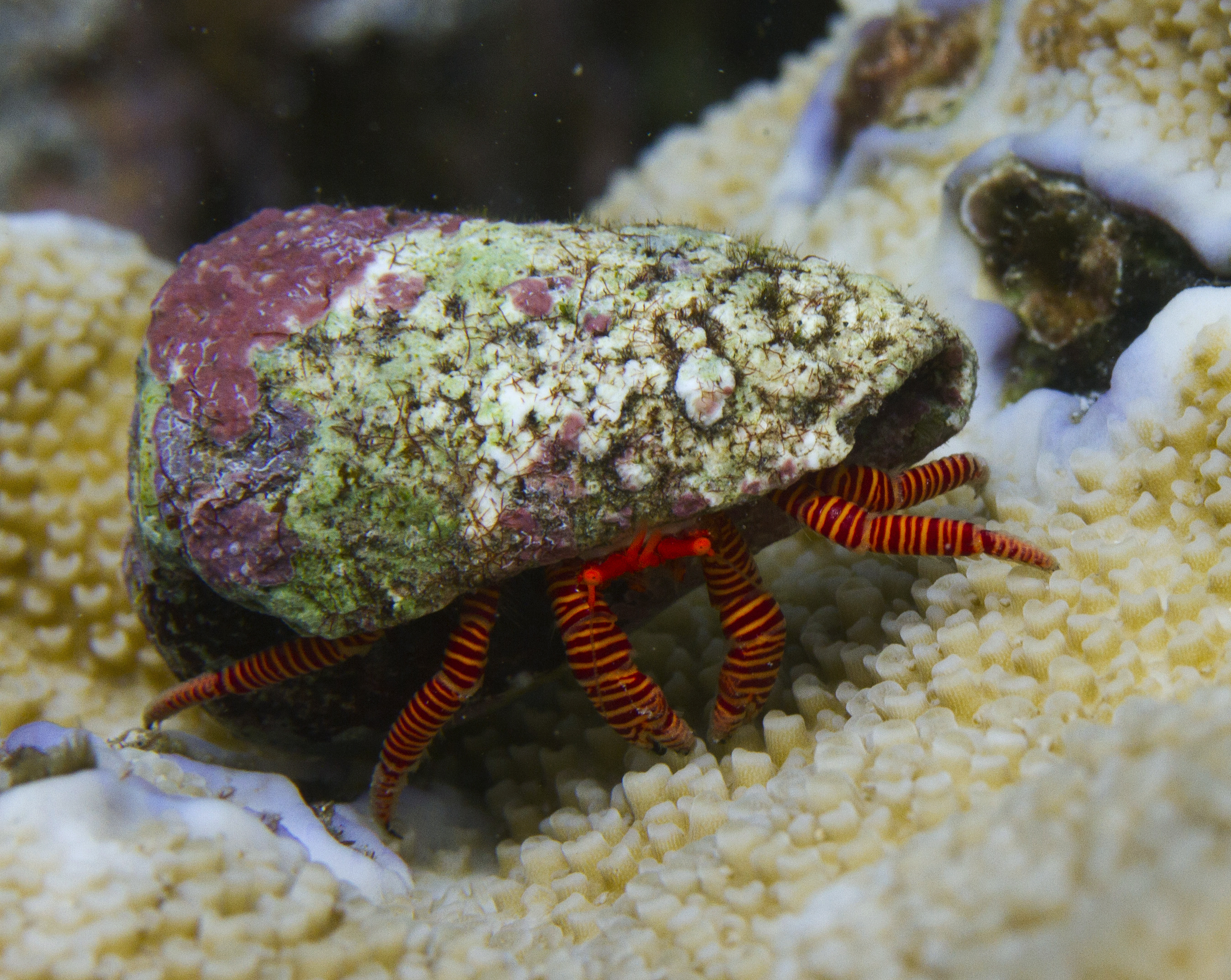
Ciliopagurus strigatus

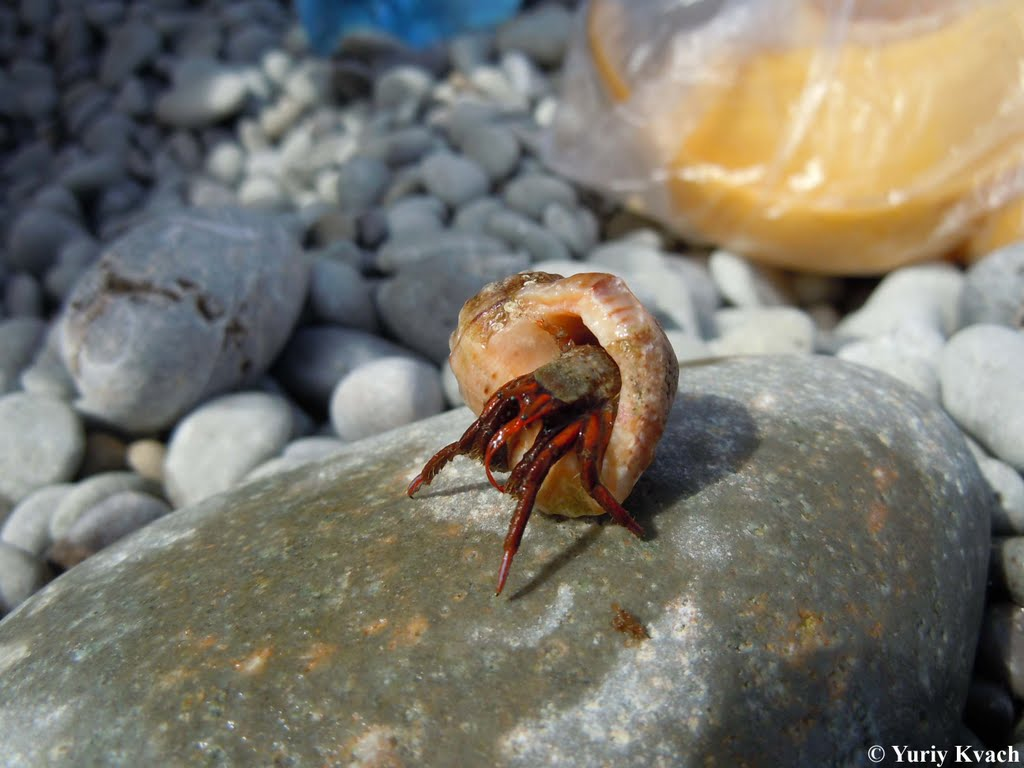
Clibanarius erythropus

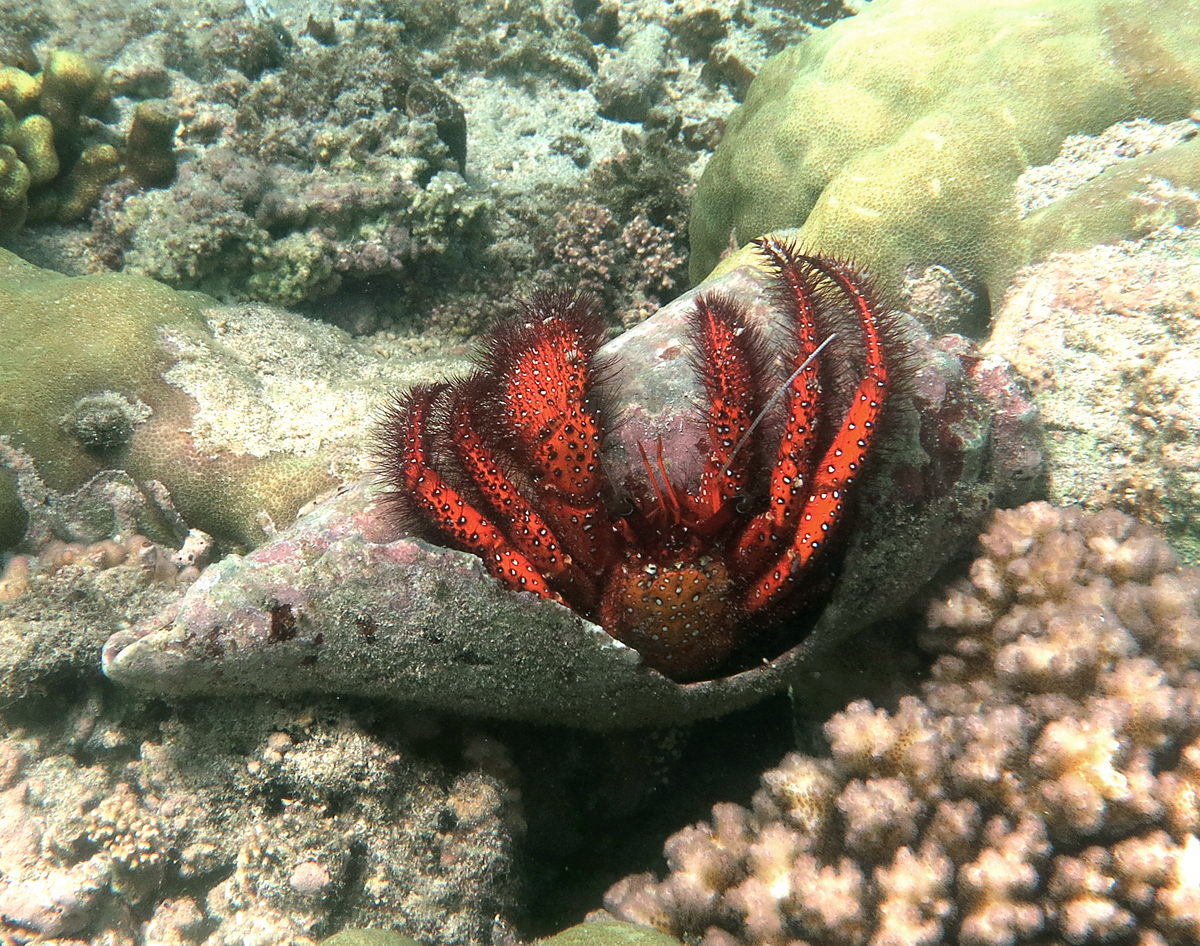
Dardanus megistos

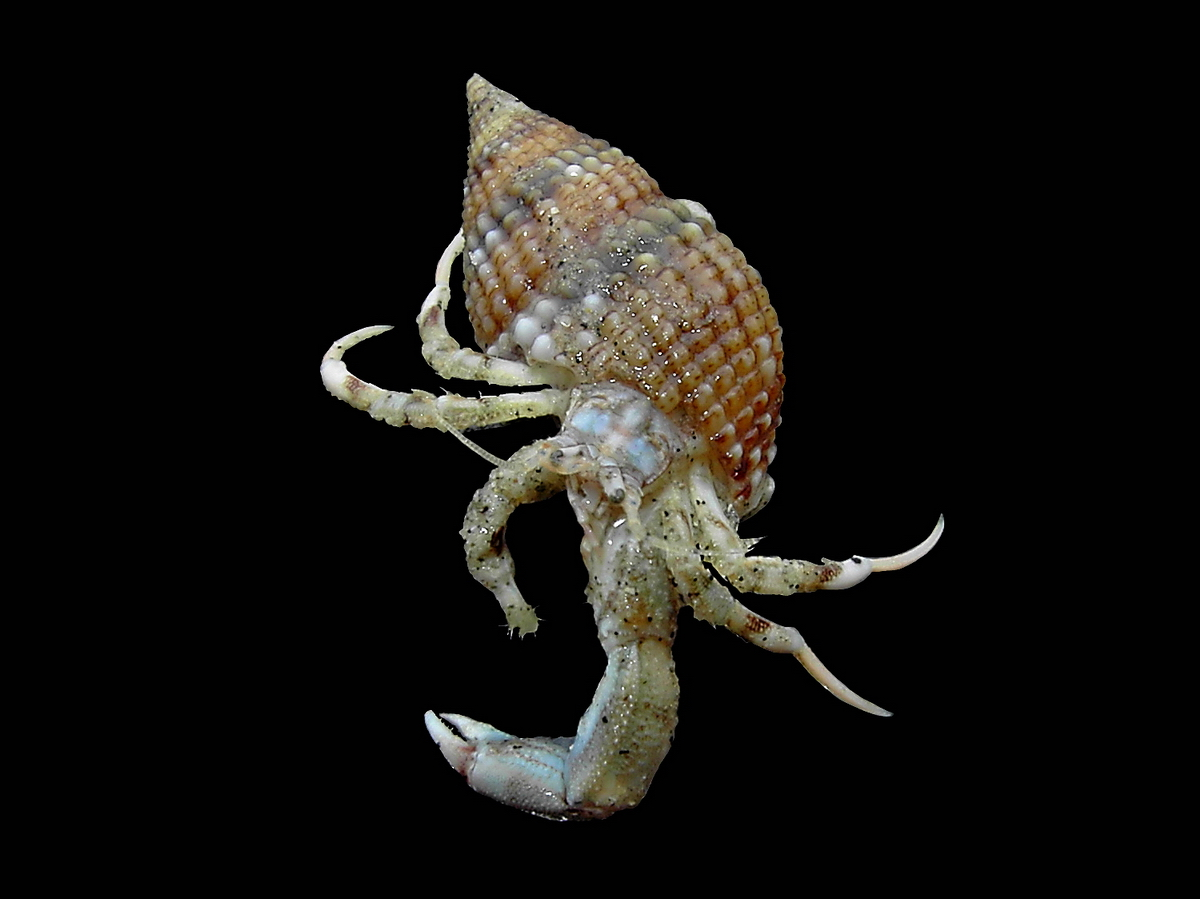
Diogenes pugilator

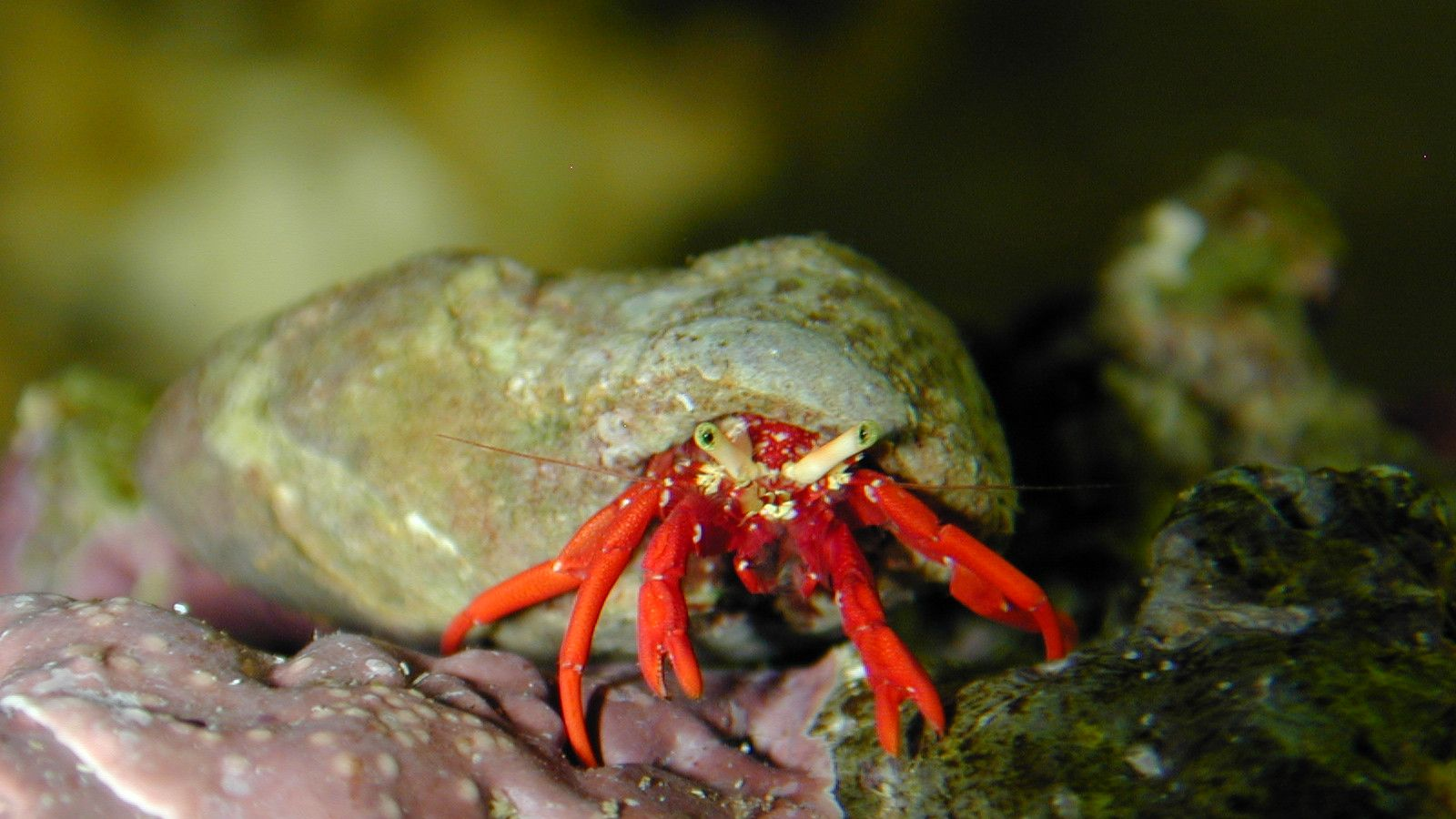
Paguristes cadenati

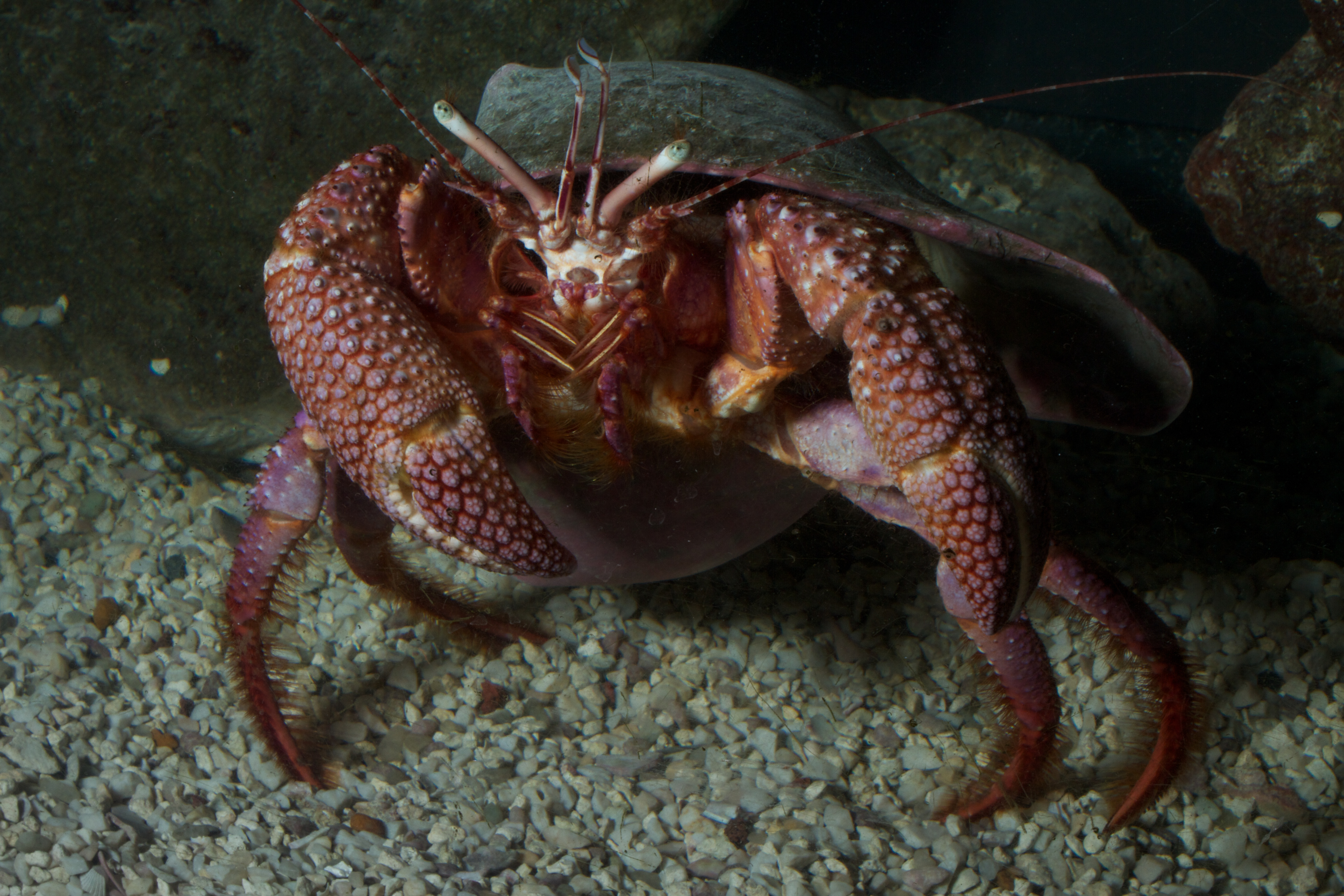
Petrochirus diogenes

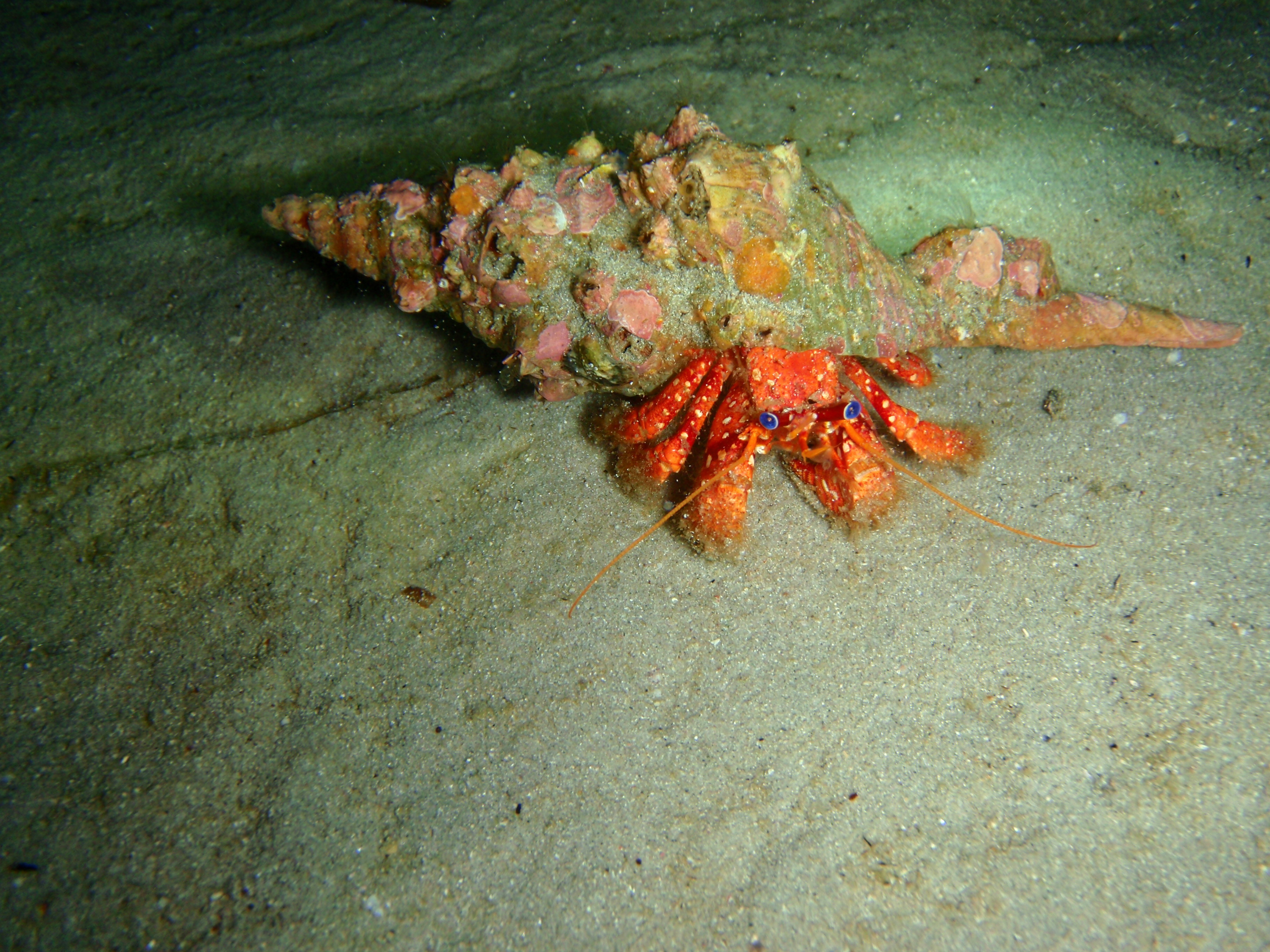
Strigopagurus strigimanus
