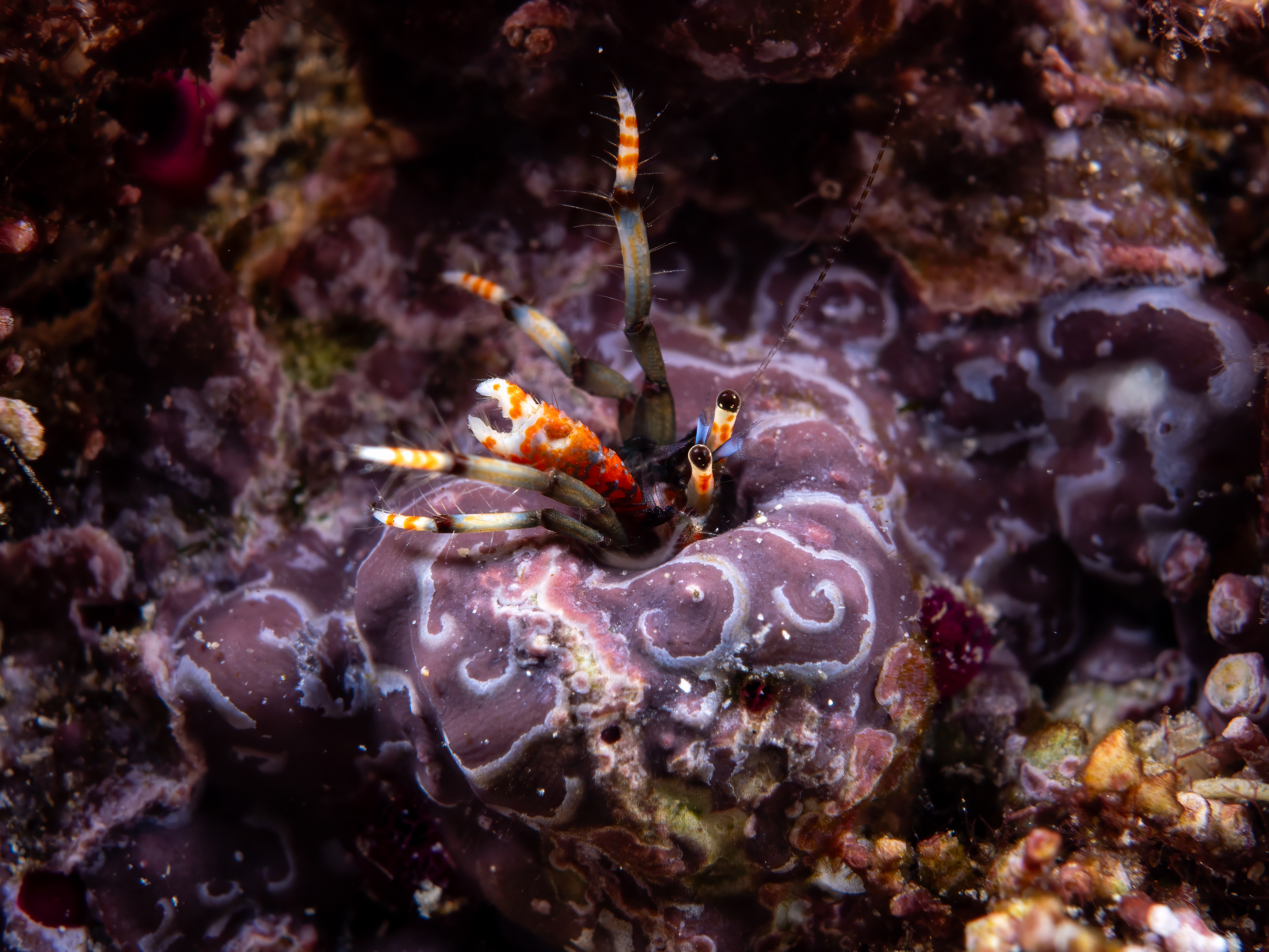

Scientific classification
- Kingdom: Animalia
- Phylum: Arthropoda
- Clade: Pancrustacea
- Class: Malacostraca
- Order: Decapoda
- Suborder: Pleocyemata
- Infraorder: Anomura
- Family: Diogenidae
- Genus: Calcinus
- Species: C. tubularis

Binomial name
- Calcinus tubularis (Linnaeus, 1767)

Synonyms
- Calcinus ornatus (Roux, 1830); Cancer tubularis Linnaeus, 1767; Clibanarius rouxi Heller, 1863; Pagurus ornatus Roux, 1830

= Calcinus tubularis =

Species of crustacean

Calcinus tubularis is a species of hermit crab. It is found in the Mediterranean Sea and around islands in the Atlantic Ocean, where it lives below the intertidal zone. Its carapace, eyestalks and claws are marked with numerous red spots. C. tubularis and its sister species, C. verrilli, are the only hermit crabs known to show sexual dimorphism in shell choice, with males using normal marine gastropod shells, while females use shells of gastropods in the family Vermetidae, which are attached to rocks or other hard substrates.

== Distribution ==
The genus Calcinus has its centre of diversity in the central Pacific Ocean, and only two species occur in the north-eastern Atlantic – Calcinus paradoxus and Calcinus tubularis. C. tubularis is a chiefly Mediterranean species; its range extends from Madeira in the west to Lebanon in the east, with outlying records from Madeira, the Canary Islands, Cape Verde and Ascension Island. Although it is distinctively coloured, the sedentary behaviour of C. tubularis allows epibionts to colonise its shells, providing excellent camouflage, and it can easily go unnoticed; it was first reported on the coast of the Portuguese mainland in 2011, but is thought to have been living there for a long time.

== Description ==
The carapace of Calcinus tubularis is bluish, with many red spots, and extends forwards as a short, triangular rostrum. The eyestalks are white with similar red spotting, as is the last segment of each of the walking legs, and both the fixed and movable fingers of the claws. The colour scheme exists in a dark form and a light form, which appears to be linked to camouflage, particularly for females. C. tubularis is of "normal size" for a Calcinus species, frequently exceeding a carapace width of 3 millimetres (0.12 in).

== Ecology ==
Calcinus tubularis is a rare species, found below the intertidal zone. It is one of only two species of hermit crab (the other being the closely related C. verrilli) in which sexual dimorphism in shell use has been observed. Males inhabit gastropod shells, chiefly those of Pisania maculosa or Cerithium vulgatum, which they can move freely; females occupy the fixed tubes made by the vermetid snail Lementina arenaria.

The only parasite known to attack Calcinus tubularis is a rhizocephalan barnacle, probably of the genus Septosaccus, although it is also targeted by another barnacle, Trypetesa lampas, which is an egg predator of various hermit crabs.

== Taxonomy ==
Calcinus tubularis was first described by Carl Linnaeus in the 1767 12th edition of his Systema Naturae, under the name Cancer tubularis. It was later described by Polydore Roux as Pagurus ornatus, and that species was transferred to the genus Calcinus in 1892 by Édouard Chevreux and Eugène Louis Bouvier. Lipke Holthuis recognised that C. ornatus was a junior synonym of Cancer tubularis, and transferred Linnaeus' species to the genus Calcinus, at which point it reached its current scientific name. The specific epithet tubularis refers to the animals habit of living in the tubes of vermetid molluscs. Linnaeus' description is imprecise, and could refer to "practically any hermit crab", but the type locality (the Mediterranean Sea), together with the statement that it lives in worm tubes, restricts the possibilities to this one species.

== Evolution ==
The sister species of Calcinus tubularis is C. verrilli, which is endemic to Bermuda. The two species show the same sexual dimorphism in shell choice, making this an example of niche conservatism.
