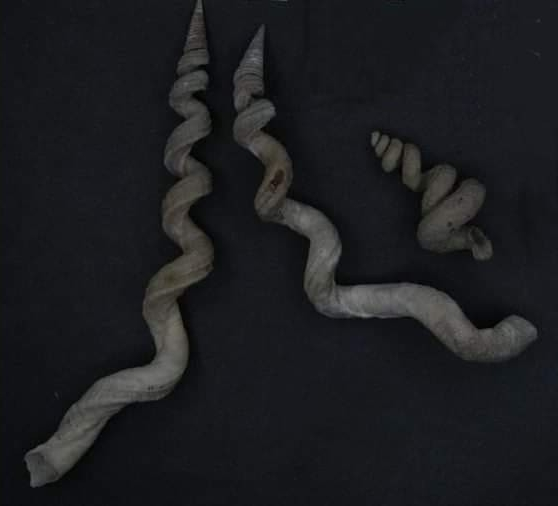
- Vermicularia spp.

Scientific classification
- Kingdom: Animalia
- Phylum: Mollusca
- Class: Gastropoda
- Subclass: Caenogastropoda
- Order: incertae sedis
- Family: Turritellidae
- Subfamily: Turritellinae
- Genus: Vermicularia; Lamarck, 1799

Synonyms
- Vermiculus Lister, 1688

= Vermicularia =

Genus of gastropods

Vermicularia is a genus of sea snails, marine gastropod molluscs in the family Turritellidae.

== Species ==
Species within the genus Vermicularia include:

- Vermicularia bathyalis Petuch, 2002
- Vermicularia fargoi Olsson, 1951
- Vermicularia frisbeyae McLean, 1970
- Vermicularia gracilis (Maltzan, 1883)
- Vermicularia knorrii (Deshayes, 1843)
- Vermicularia lumbricalis (Linnaeus, 1758)
- Vermicularia maoriana Powell, 1937
- Vermicularia pellucida (Broderip & Sowerby, 1829)
- Vermicularia radicula (Stimpson, 1851)
- Vermicularia spirata (Philippi, 1836)
- Vermicularia tenuis (Rousseau in Chenu, 1843)
- Vermicularia tortuosa (Lightfoot, 1786)

Species brought into synonymy

- Vermicularia fewkesi (Yates, 1890): synonym of Vermicularia pellucida eburnea (Reeve, 1842)
- Vermicularia scaber (Gravenhorst, 1831): synonym of Vermetus scaberGravenhorst, 1831
