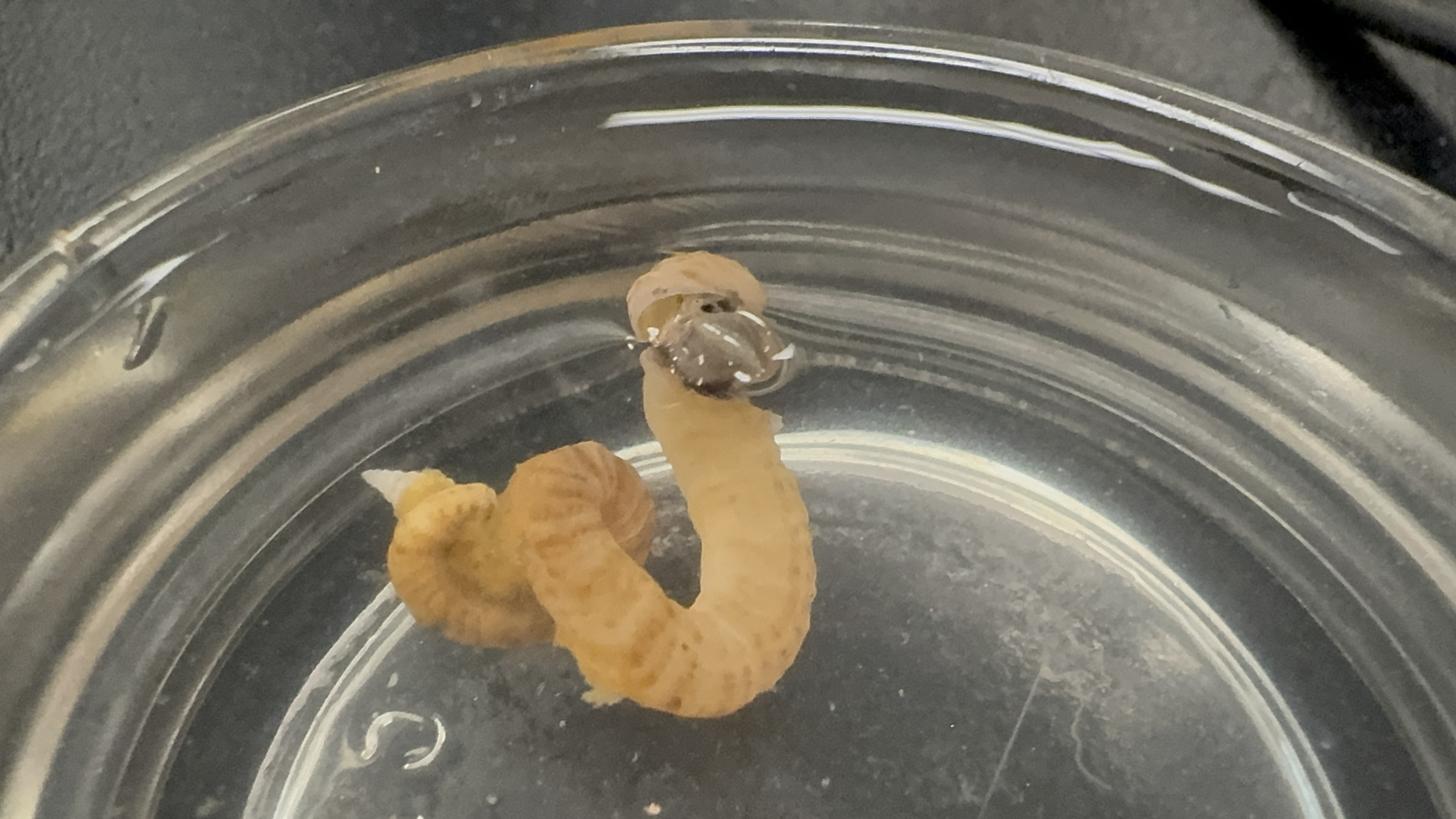

Scientific classification
- Kingdom: Animalia
- Phylum: Mollusca
- Class: Gastropoda
- Subclass: Caenogastropoda
- Order: incertae sedis
- Family: Turritellidae
- Genus: Vermicularia
- Species: V. knorrii

Binomial name
- Vermicularia knorrii Deshayes, 1843

Synonyms
- Vermetus knorri Deshayes, 1843; Vermicularia lumbricalis Linnaeus, 1758

= Vermicularia knorrii =

Species of gastropods

Vermicularia knorrii, commonly known as the Florida worm snail, is a species of sea snail, a marine gastropod in the family Turritellidae. V. knorrii has been concluded to be the junior synonym to Vermicularia lumbricalis. The shell of Florida worm snail is light brown or tan in color with an apex that is white. It is found living in reefs on the coasts of the southern states of the United States to the top of South America. V. knorri use their ciliated appendages to trap plankton and sperm.

== Distribution ==
This species is found in the United States from Florida to North Carolina, the Gulf Coast, the eastern coast of Mexico, Aruba, The Bahamas, Antigua, Barbuda, Cuba, Jamaica, Puerto Rico, and Bermuda. Vermicularia knorrii is strictly marine and does not live in brackish or fresh waters and is not terrestrial. V. knorrii is found in waters with temperatures around 28 °C (82 °F).

== Habitat ==
Vermicularia knorrii habitat ranges from 35.34°N to 12°N and 92°W to 64.7°W. They can be found between depths of 2–500 m (7–1,640 ft), but typically live in water 14–110 m (46–361 ft). The deepest recorded depth of Vermicularia knorrii is about 500 m (1,600 ft) on the continental slope of Texas, but it may have been another species wrongfully identified at the greater depths. This places the Florida worm snail's habitat in the epipelagic and mesopelagic zones most often being found in the photic zone.

Unlike other Vermicularia species, the Florida worm snail does not form inter-coil structures but rather lives in hard substrates such as corals and sponges. It stays in the substrate by cementing itself in it. V. knorrii can be found in "boiler" reefs, rim reefs, subtidal, and patch reefs. It appears to be vulnerable of desiccation, or the removal of water, usually during low tides.

== Shell ==
The shell of this species is 20–80 mm (0.79–3.15 in) in length. When the shell is intact, the apex is pure white, somewhat translucent, and tightly coiled similarly to that of the genus Turritella. The regularly coiled apex is around 12.5 mm (0.49 in) in length. The subsequent whorls are brown, and they are loosely and irregularly coiled, such that the whorls do not touch. Their irregular shape helps them anchor into sponges, rocks, and corals. The irregular shape of their shells gives the Florida worm snail its name as they resemble the tubes made by tube worms.

As they grow, Vermicularia shells start to uncoil due to the need to access food and to attach to substrate they live in stabley. The shells are also used by hermit crabs, such as Calcinus verrillii, as shelter. The odd shapes of the worm snail shells affect the symmetry of the uropods.

== Feeding ==
Due to the Florida worm snail living in sponges and corals, it is sessile and does not actively hunt for food. It is a suspension feeder and catches food by expelling cilia and mucus from its mantle. The mantle cavity elongates the gill surface and pushes out the cilia. The cilia flow with the current, creating a mucus net that catches plankton. The snail then retracts the strings and uses its radula to eat the food.

== Reproduction and life cycle ==
Although not much is known about the reproductive cycle of Vermicularia knorrii, it is thought to be gonochoristic and broadcast spawn. It is theorized that Vermicularia knorrii has similar reproductive and life stages to its sister gastropod, Vermicularia spirata. Vermicularia spirata is protandrous hermaphroditic with small males being free living and eventually attaching to substrate when switching sexes. Both males and females have open pallial ducts, which serves as the fertilization pouch and seminal receptacle in the female. Females receive sperm from nearby males and fertilization occurs. Eggs are brooded in the mantle cavity of the mantle which hatch as veliger larvae with shells with two and a half whorls. This is likely the reproduction cycle that V. knorrii follow as V. spirata have very similar gross morphology.

== Gallery ==
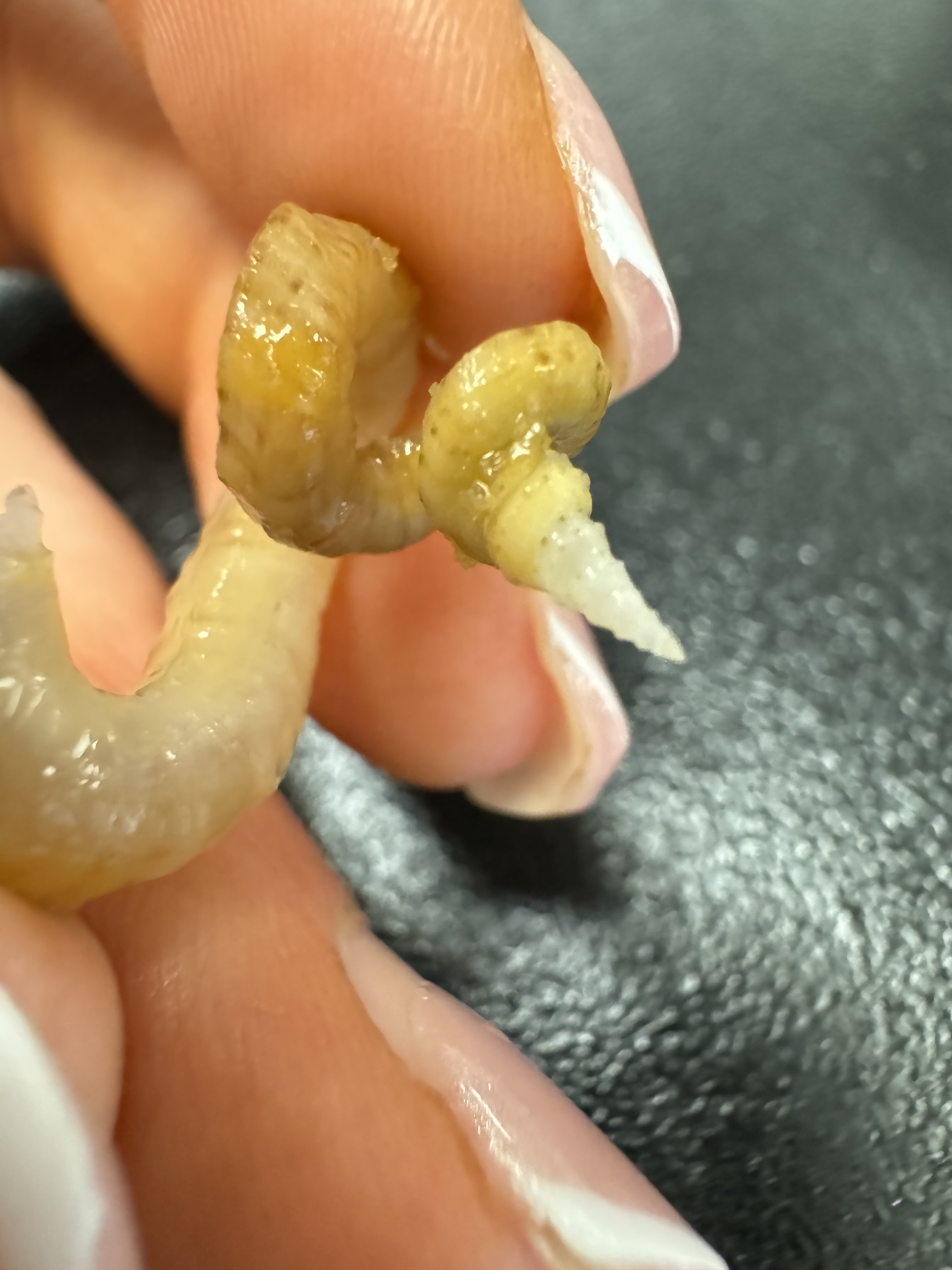
Vermicularia knorrii

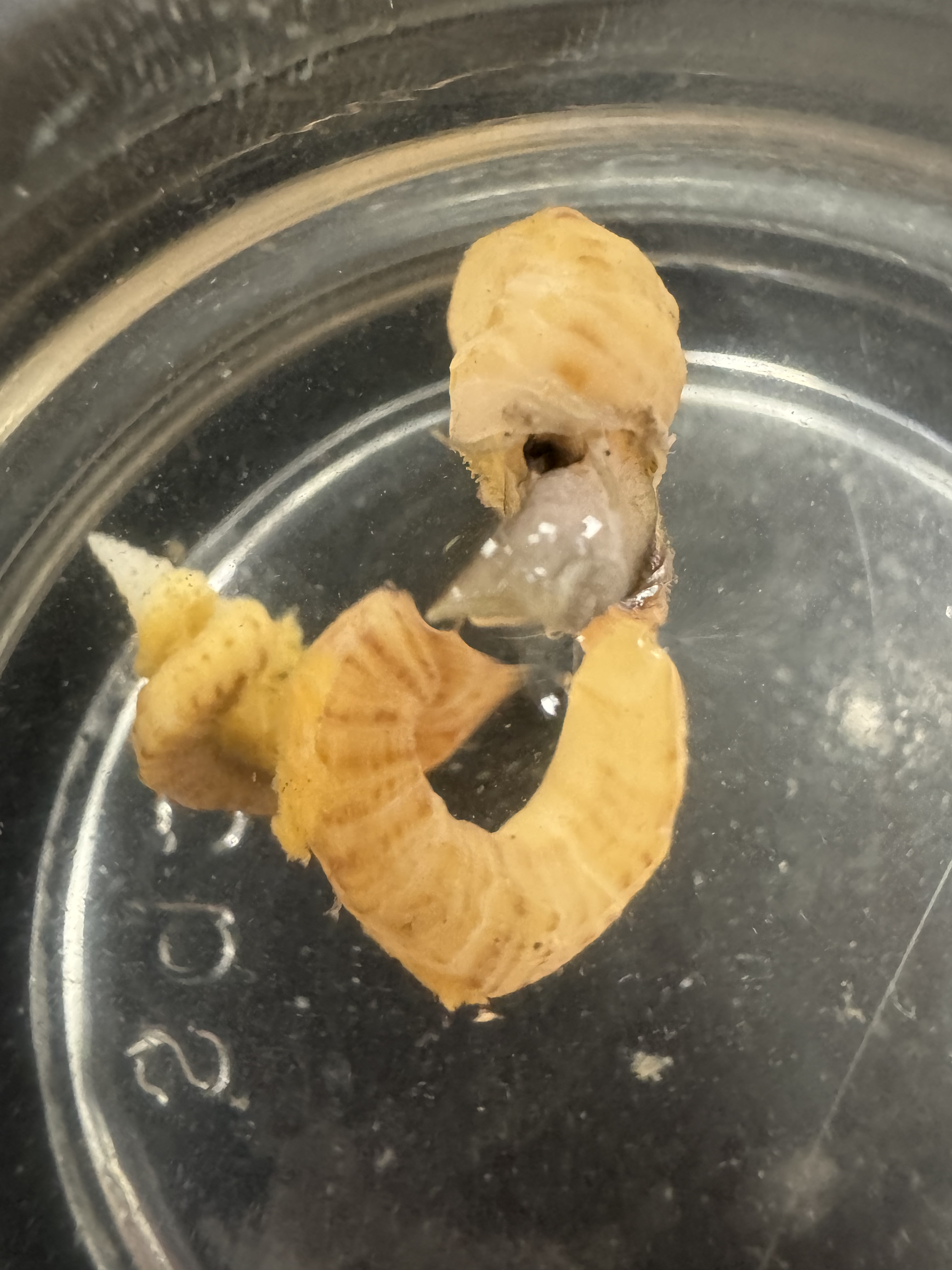
Vermicularia knorrii

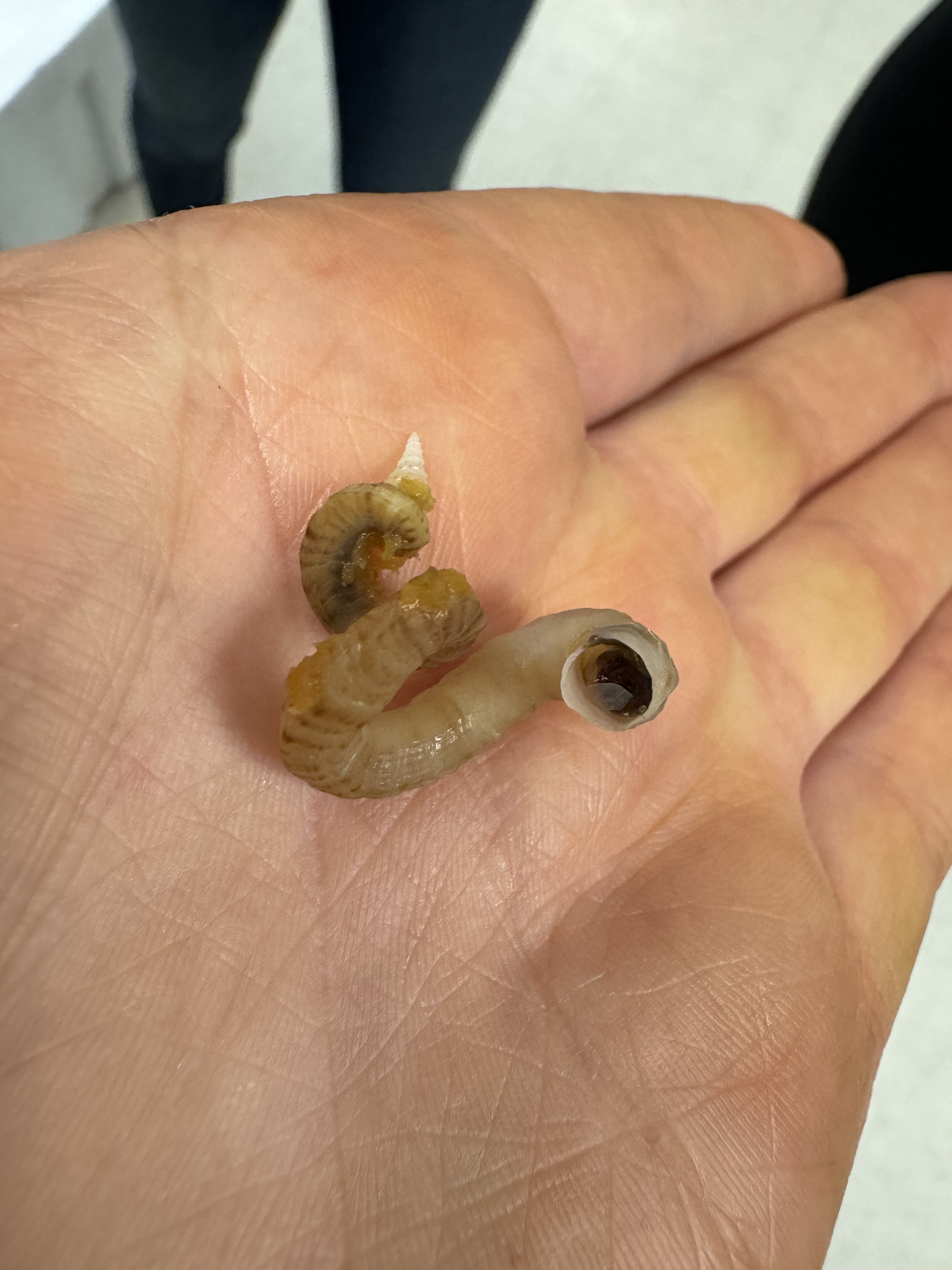
Vermicularia knorrii

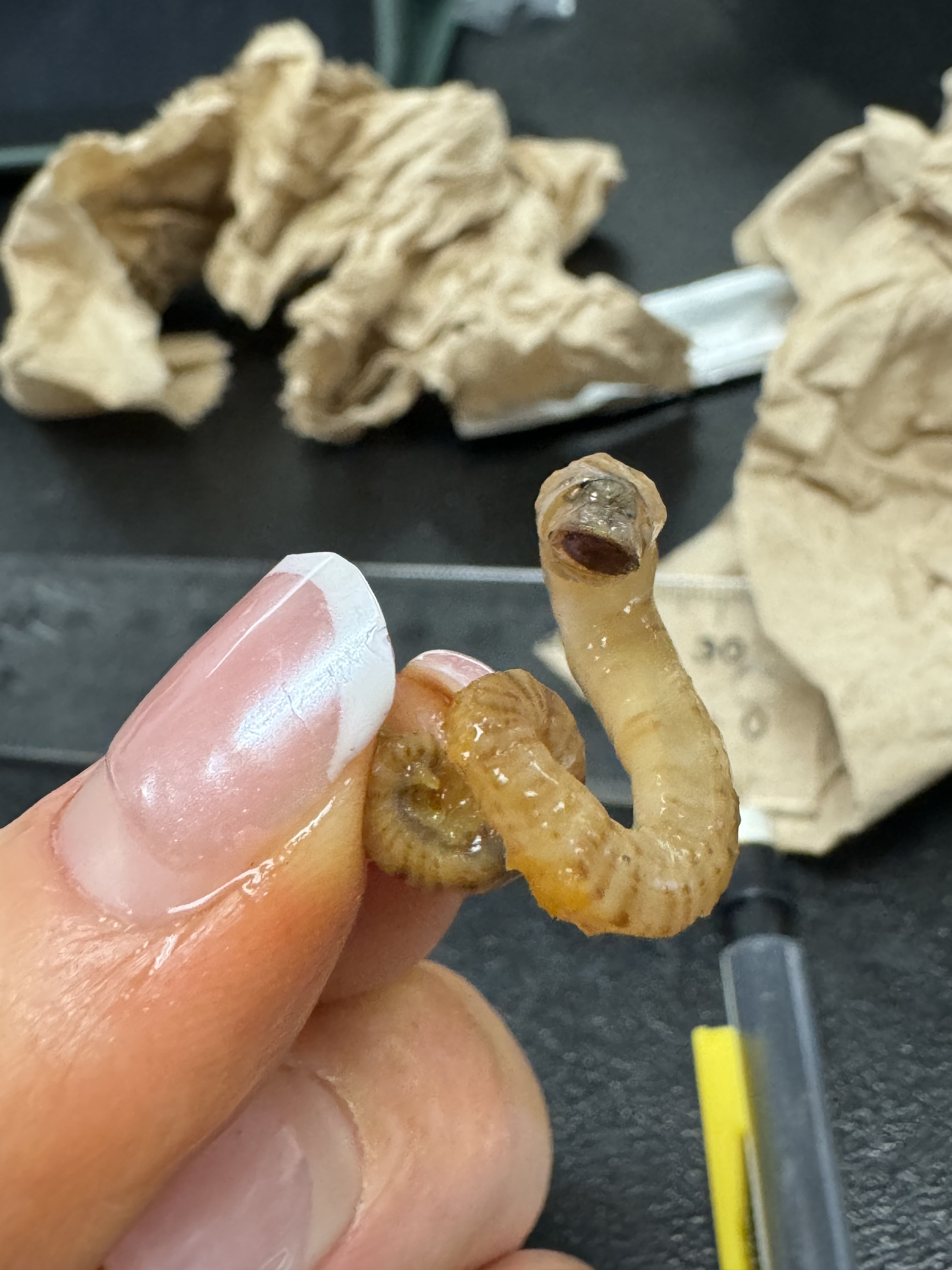
Vermicularia knorrii

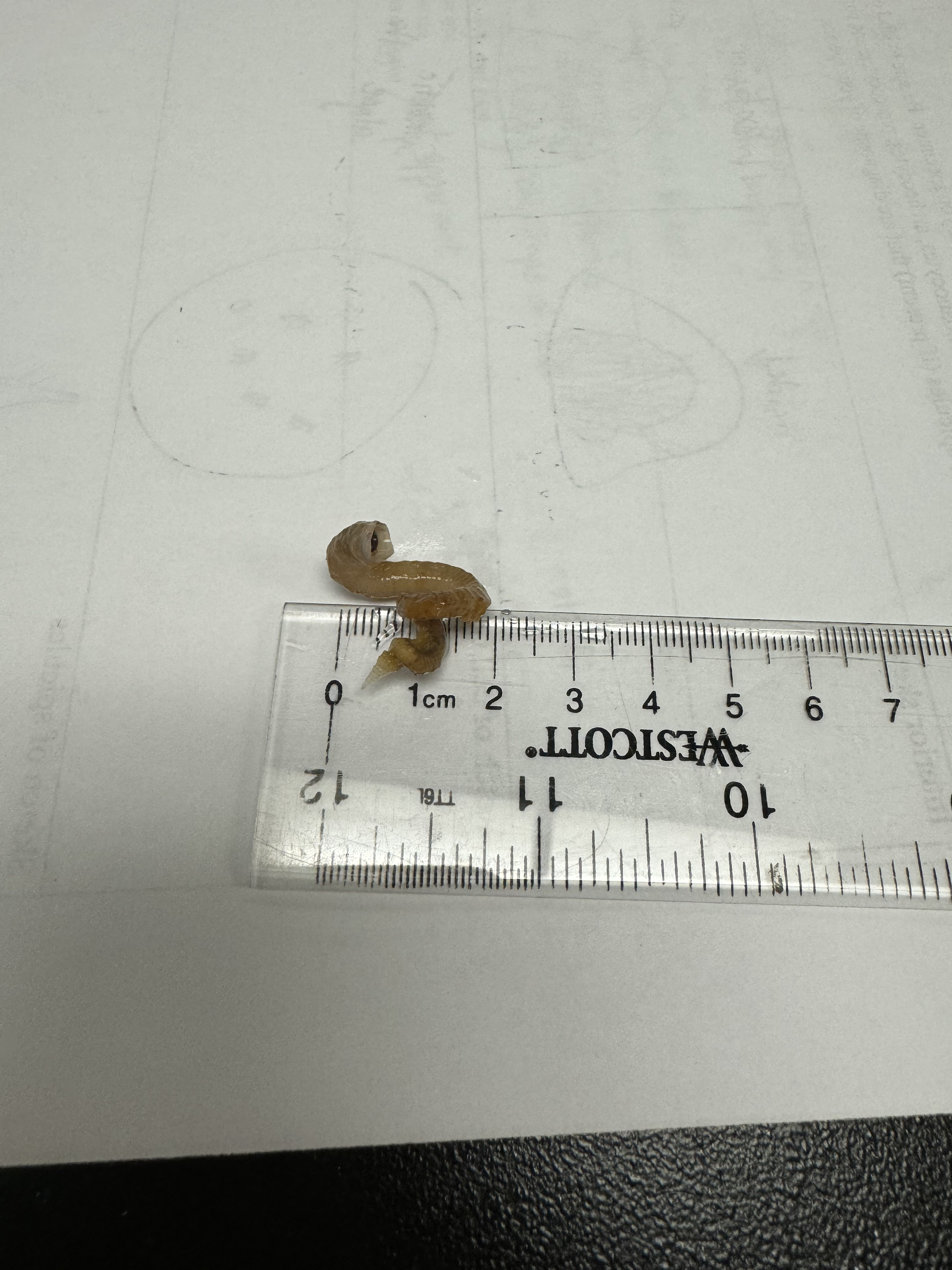
Vermicularia knorrii
