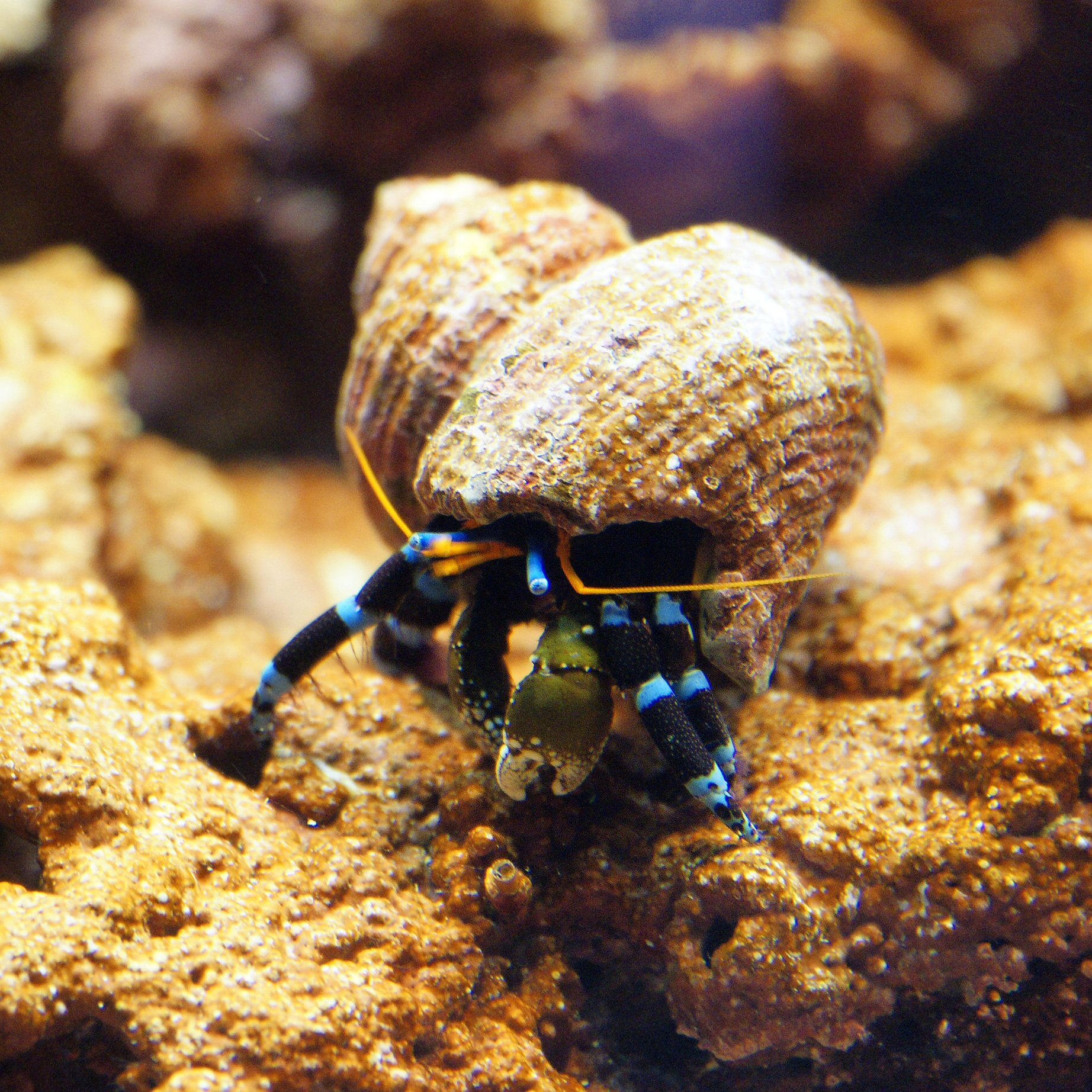

Scientific classification
- Kingdom: Animalia
- Phylum: Arthropoda
- Class: Malacostraca
- Order: Decapoda
- Suborder: Pleocyemata
- Infraorder: Anomura
- Family: Diogenidae
- Genus: Calcinus
- Species: C. elegans

Binomial name
- Calcinus elegans (H. Milne-Edwards, 1836)

Synonyms
- Pagurus elegans H. Milne-Edwards, 1836; Pagurus pictus Owen, 1839; Pagurus decorus J. W. Randall, 1840

= Calcinus elegans =

Species of crustacean

Calcinus elegans, also known as the blue line hermit crab, is a small, tropical hermit crab.

== Description ==
It features the typical body plan of a member of the phylum Arthropoda: a segmented head, a thorax, and an abdomen. As a member of order Decapoda, this organism has 5 pairs of legs, with one pair having developed into sharper claws, or chela. This hermit crab supports the heavy shell of a gastropod with its four pairs of ambulatory legs, shielding its soft abdomen inside. It features a unique and exotic color pattern, sporting alternating bright blue and black stripes on its legs and olive green chela with white speckles on the ends. Two bright blue eyes peer out of the shell alongside two orange antennae and two orange antennules. The organism also has maxillae to help guide particles of food into its mouth. Some morphological differences arise based upon the geologic habitat the organism resides in. For instance, some individuals of Calcinus elegans found in Hawaii display orange bands on their ambulatory legs, differing from the pure blue bands found in individuals of the Indo-Pacific ( Java, Bali, Lombok Islands ). Calcinus elegans is distinct from all other species in the Calcinus genus as it is the only one to be covered with small hairs known as seta.

== Habitat ==
Calcinus elegans primarily makes its home in shallow tidal and subtidal regions found within the Indo-West Pacific (Java, Bali, Lombok Islands), stretching from Eastern Africa to island chains just south of Hawaii. Some of them can also be found living in the tropics of the U.S. Virgin Islands near Puerto Rico. Some sightings have even been reported at various locations in Japan including the Ryukyu Islands, Izu, Ogasawara, Kochi, Boso, and the Kii Peninsula. Its distribution primarily follows the path of the equator; these places are known to have tropical conditions such as higher ocean temperatures, clear waters, and little primary productivity. These habitats have a depth range of 0–20 meters (0–66 feet), a sea surface salinity range of 30-35 ppt, and a sea surface temperature range of 20–30 °C (68–86 °F).

== Behavior ==
=== Shell selection ===
Each member of the Calcinus elegans species will select a shell for itself, occasionally switching shells with other species members or empty shells it finds during its lifetime. Shell exchanges could be performed due to the current shell being structurally unstable, too heavy, or perhaps too large or small. Shell exchange was also found to occur within the Calcinus genus as a result of interspecific competition, as individuals of a certain species battle for a perfect shell. Some studies show that the sex of the individual may also play a role in the competition; this behavior is observed in individuals of Calcinus verrilli. These shells are primarily used to provide shelter and protection from predators as well as the surrounding environment. Individuals of Calcinus elegans were found to show a preference for the shells of dog whelks, but were also observed wearing shells of the snakehead cowrie and variable worm. This shows that the species exhibits a variety of morphology.

Shell shape was also found to influence the distribution of Calcinus elegans within their habitat. Those with cowrie or variable worm shells often remained in shallow waters, refraining from entering the subtidal areas out of fear of predation. When tested, cowrie shells and variable worm shells proved to be a weak defense system against the predators of the subtidal. Calcinus elegans that wear the shells of dog whelks prefer to live within the subtidal region, as their shell shape allows them to effectively deter predators.

Shell shape shows no significant impact upon the travel rate to obtain food for individuals of Calcinus elegans. Therefore, there is no select locomotive advantage of wearing a certain species’ shell.

Studies conducted using simulated surges show that shell shape influences the ability of Calcinus elegans to withstand wave action. Individuals wearing shells of dog whelks were proven to resist surge much more effectively than those with snakehead cowrie or variable worm shells.

=== Sense of smell ===
Calcinus elegans relies heavily on its keen sense of smell for detecting danger in the surrounding environment. This hermit crab is constantly wary of not only the smell of its predators, but the smell of gastropod shells being broken. As it relies on its gastropod shell for protection, Calcinus elegans knows that such a smell indicates that a predator is nearby and on the hunt. Usually, Calcinus elegans will attempt to find shelter or a place to hide from its predators. In the event that it is unable to locate shelter, Calcinus elegans will withdraw into its shell for defense, only emerging when it feels safe or the scents of danger have passed on. Studies have shown that the amount of time that Calcinus elegans spends withdrawn into its shell is partially determined by what species of gastropod the shell belonged to.

=== Reproduction ===
The blue line hermit crab shows a sign of remarkable intelligence. These organisms will traditionally engage in unique behaviors before mating. Some such examples include the male rotating the female’s shell or rubbing their chelipeds, or claws, around the opening of the female’s shell. Unlike most crustaceans, Calcinus elegans does not perform a shell exchange during mating.

=== Feeding ===
Calcinus elegans are nocturnal omnivorous detritivores, exploring seagrass beds at night to scavenge for detritus and larger decaying plant and animal matter.

== Threats ==
=== Global climate change ===
Ocean acidification and a continual decline in the ocean’s pH will likely have drastic consequences for hermit crabs such as Calcinus elegans. The shells of hermit crabs, primarily composed of calcium carbonate, are easily susceptible to a decline in pH. Low pH environments degrade calcium carbonate rapidly, creating a large amount of structural instability within the hermit crab’s primary defense system. Without proper protection from sturdy shells and a decline in the number of suitable shells within the environment, the population of Calcinus elegans, and other hermit crabs may begin to drop. Studies have also been performed that indicate that the resulting stress of ocean acidification could be impacting the hermit crabs’ sense of smell. Insufficient sensory stimuli were found to reduce both feeding behavior and even the rate of shell exchange.

=== Predators ===
As Calcinus elegans primarily relies on the shelter of its shell for protection and defense, its primary predators are individuals who have adapted to breaking gastropod shells. The white spotted eagle ray is one such predator. Found in Australia and Taiwan's Penghu Islands, this organism uses unique crushing plates in its mouth to shatter the shells of its prey. It feeds on mollusks, gastropods, and members of the Diogenidae family, which includes hermit crabs such as Calcinus elegans.

== Ecology ==
While typically reclusive, hermit crabs will on occasion forge a relationship with other marine organisms. Some cnidarians use the hard surface of hermit crab shells to settle and grow polyps. The cnidaria aid in defending the crab from predators using their stinging cnidae and may reduce the need for frequent shell exchange. In return, the hermit crab provides them a settling ground as well as transport to new environments, which may contain more nutrients for the cnidaria in the form of detritus or microorganisms. However, relationships with other organisms can prove to be complicated and are not always symbiotic; some cnidaria interfere with reproduction and may even increase a hermit crab's risk of predation. These relationships have to be carefully considered so that the benefits to the hermit crab outweigh the costs. If the cost is too high, the hermit crab may abandon its shell and locate a replacement.

Some algae also use the heavy shell of Calcinus elegans as a settling ground. Many of its shells have been found crusted with coralline algae. This algae provides a strong and smooth surface for coral polyps to settle on, possibly being responsible for the symbioses that can occur between corals or other cnidarians and hermit crabs.
