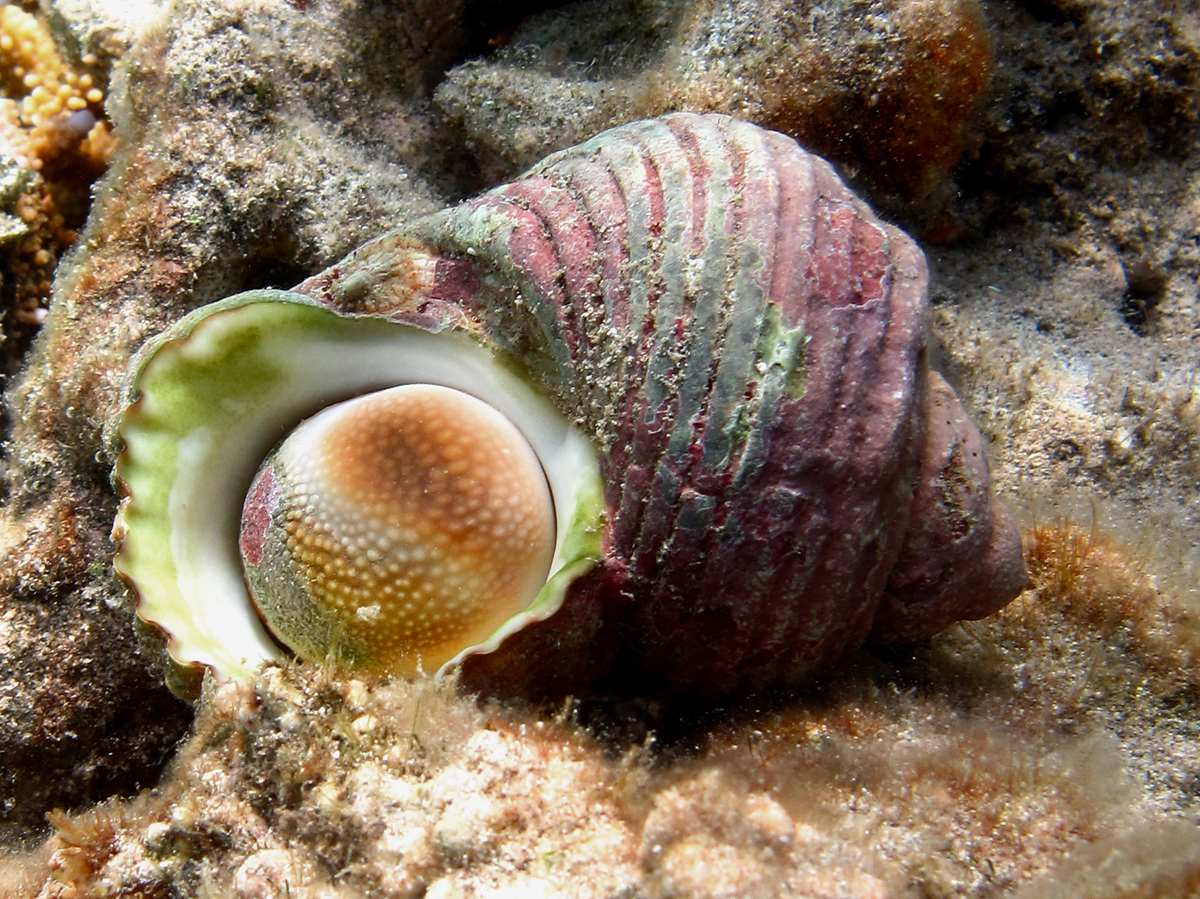

Scientific classification
- Kingdom: Animalia
- Phylum: Mollusca
- Class: Gastropoda
- Subclass: Vetigastropoda
- Order: Trochida
- Family: Turbinidae
- Genus: Turbo
- Species: T. argyrostomus

Binomial name
- Turbo argyrostomus Linnaeus, 1758

Synonyms
- Lunatica argentata Rôding, 1798; Lunatica taitensis Noodt, 1819; Turbo canaliculatus Gmelin, 1791; Turbo margaritaceus Linnaeus, 1758 (nomen dubium); Turbo pallidus Perry, G., 1811; Turbo (Marmarostoma) argyrostomus Linnaeus, 1758; Turbo (Senectus) margaritaceus Linnaeus, 1758

= Turbo argyrostomus =

Species of gastropod

Turbo argyrostomus, common name the silver-mouthed turban, is a species of sea snail, marine gastropod mollusk in the family Turbinidae.

== Subspecies ==
Two subspecies have been recognized :

- Turbo argyrostomus argyrostomus Linnaeus, 1758 (synonyms : Turbo argentata Röding, 1798; Turbo argenteus Anton, 1839; Turbo canaliculatus Gmelin, 1791; Turbo carduus P. Fischer, 1873; Turbo ferrugineus Anton, 1839; Turbo permundus Iredale, 1929; Turbo princeps Philippi, 1846; Turbo psittacinus Philippi, 1846; Turbo semicostatus Pease, 1861) : this subspecies has been placed by same authors in the subgenus Turbo (Marmarostoma)
  - Turbo argyrostomus argyrostomus f. carduus P. Fischer, 1873
- Turbo argyrostomus perspeciosus (Iredale, 1929): (synonym : Turbo speciosus Reeve, 1848) : this subspecies has been placed by same authors in the subgenus Turbo (Marmarostoma)

Subspecies brought into synonymy

- Turbo argyrostomus lajonkairii (Deshayes, 1839): this subspecies has been placed by same authors in the subgenus Turbo (Marmarostoma) : synonym of Turbo lajonkairii (Deshayes, 1839)
- Turbo argyrostomus sandwicensis (Pease, 1861): this subspecies has been placed by same authors in the subgenus Turbo (Marmarostoma) : synonym of Turbo sandwicensis (Pease, 1861)

== Description ==
This species grows to a length of up to 9 cm. The solid, large shell has an ovate-pointed shape. This is a very variable species. The color pattern of the shell is cream, irregularly maculated with greenish and brown, and broken lines of black. The apex is almost always pink. The six whorls are convex, separated by subcanaliculate sutures. The upper two whorls are smooth, the lower spirally lirate and radiately more or less squamose striate. The lirae are sometimes subequal and nearly smooth. The main body whorl has 20 distinct spiral ribs, mostly flat-topped, some with fluted scales. The body whorl contains about thirteen lirae, which are generally wider than their interstices, and of which the subcoronal and one or two median ones are more prominent. The penultimate and last whorl bear numerous elevated vaulted scales upon the lirae. The aperture is pearly white or brownish tinted within, about half the length of the shell. It is round-ovate, angled above, dilated and subchannelled below. The columella is thickened, somewhat flattened and grooved below the narrow deeply perforating umbilicus. T

The operculum is flat inside with 5 whorls. Its nucleus is situated one-third the distance across the face. The outer surface is convex, with coarse obtuse granules, which are largest upon the higher part, nearly surrounded by a marginal series of fine oblique wrinkles. The color is white, more or less tinged with flesh color upon the outer half, and with a narrow marginal orange line.

== Distribution ==
This species and its subspecies are distributed in the Red Sea and in the tropical Indo-West Pacific off Aldabra, Chagos, Madagascar, the Mascarene Basin, Mozambique and Tanzania; off Andaman Islands and Nicobar Islands, East India, the Philippines; off Australia (Northern Territory, Queensland, Western Australia).
