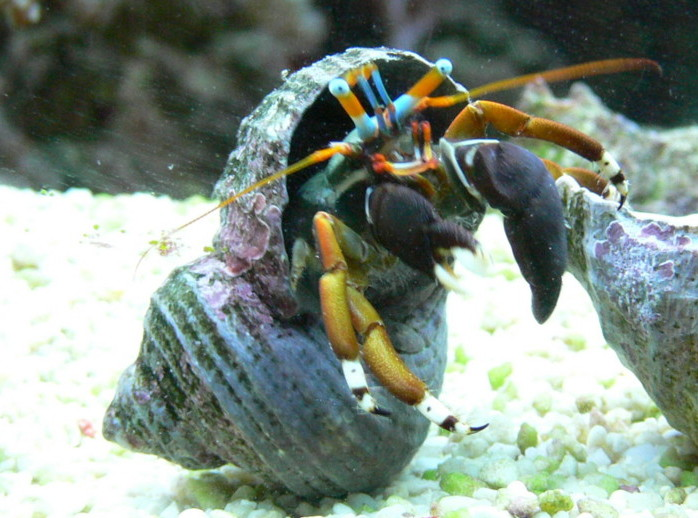

Scientific classification
- Kingdom: Animalia
- Phylum: Arthropoda
- Clade: Pancrustacea
- Class: Malacostraca
- Order: Decapoda
- Suborder: Pleocyemata
- Infraorder: Anomura
- Family: Diogenidae
- Genus: Calcinus
- Species: C. laevimanus

Binomial name
- Calcinus laevimanus (Randall, 1840)

Synonyms
- Calcinus herbstii de Man, 1888; Pagurus laevimanus Randall, 1840; Pagurus lividus H. Milne Edwards, 1848

= Calcinus laevimanus =

Species of crustacean

Calcinus laevimanus, the left-handed hermit crab, is a species of hermit crab in the genus Calcinus found in the Indo-West Pacific region, the type locality being Hawaii.

== Description ==
The anterior part of this crab is calcified while the posterior part, protected by the shell it inhabits, is not. The total length is up to 30 mm (1.2 in) with a shield length of up to 8 mm (0.3 in), with males usually being larger than females. The eyestalks are long and slender, and inflated at the base. The left cheliped (claw) is much larger than the right one. The propodus (penultimate joint) is smooth and shiny, the finger and thumb having spoon-shaped, calcified tips. The general colour of the carapace is brown to grey. The eye stalks are blue at the base and orange distally. The first pair of antennae have blue bases and orange tips and the second pair are entirely orange. The chelipeds are purplish-brown, the fingertips being white. The walking legs are orangish-brown with white tips.

== Distribution and habitat ==
C. laevimanus is found in the tropical and sub-tropical western Indo-Pacific. Its range extends from East Africa, Madagascar and the Comores, through Indonesia, the Philippines, Australia and Papua New Guinea to Hawaii, and includes many of the western Pacific archipelagoes. It is usually found between the low intertidal zone and the upper subtidal zone, typically on rocky reefs, rock and coral rubble.

== Ecology ==
When choosing a new shell, this hermit crab prefers a globose shell, especially Turbo and Nerita. In Hawaii, the shells of Trochus intextus and Turbo sandwicensis are often used, while in South Africa, an empty Lunella coronata shell is favoured. This is an aggressive hermit crab species which is prepared to fight for empty shells or other resources. The size and brightness of the white patch on the left chela seems to be a status symbol and helps its bearer in agonistic interactions.

As with other decapods, the female carries the eggs tucked under her abdomen. In Hawaii, 80% of females are carrying eggs between February and October, with about three thousand eggs being typical. Once hatched, the larvae pass through six zoeal stages and one glaucothoe stage.
