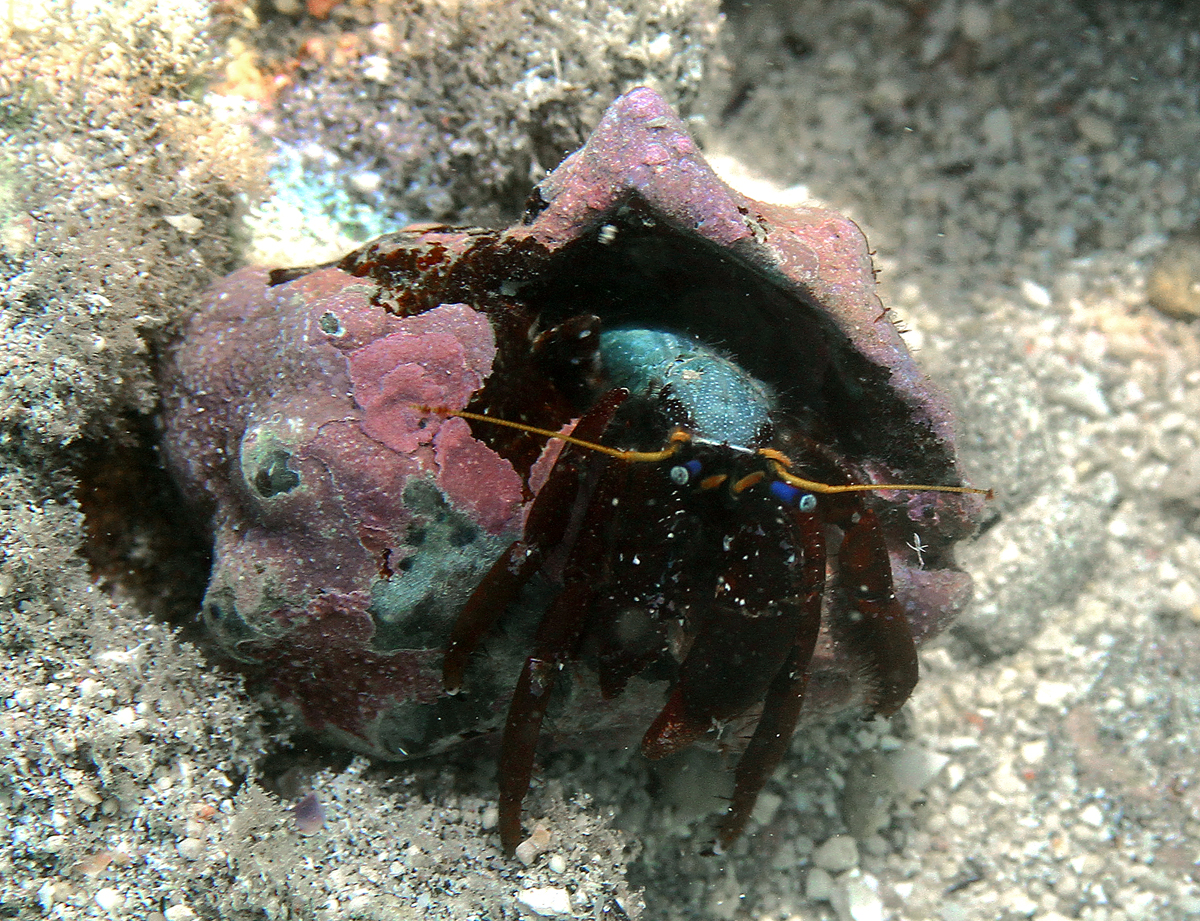

Scientific classification
- Kingdom: Animalia
- Phylum: Arthropoda
- Clade: Pancrustacea
- Class: Malacostraca
- Order: Decapoda
- Suborder: Pleocyemata
- Infraorder: Anomura
- Family: Diogenidae
- Genus: Calcinus
- Species: C. morgani

Binomial name
- Calcinus morgani Rahayu & Forest, 1999

Synonyms
- Calcinus areolatus Rahayu & Forest, 1999

= Calcinus morgani =

Species of crustacean

Calcinus morgani, commonly known as Morgan's hermit crab, is a species of hermit crab in the family Diogenidae found in the Indo-West Pacific region, the type locality being Indonesia.

== Description ==
This hermit crab has a shield 1.15 to 1.4 times as long as it is broad. The rostral lobe is triangular and the lateral projections very small and blunt. The eye-stalks have inflated bases and are nearly as long as the shield. The left cheliped (claw) has four to six robust calcified teeth on its cutting edge and the dactyl has two to four teeth on its cutting edge. The right cheliped is somewhat smaller with fewer teeth. The surfaces of both are dotted with small tubercles and low protuberances. The third pair of pereopods (walking limbs) have a brush of setae (bristles) near the claw while the other pereopods have scattered setae.

The shield is whitish with dark brown margins, the eye-stalks are bright blue with brown bases, the antennal appendages are dark brown and orange, the chelipeds are dark brown with white tips and white tubercles, and the pereopods are dark brown with white bands near the claws. This hermit crab was at one time thought to be synonymous with Calcinus gaimardii but that species has the front half of the shield dark brown and lacks the bright blue on the eye stalks which are entirely orange, apart from a little blue on the corneas.

== Distribution and habitat ==
Calcinus morgani is found in the tropical and subtropical Indo-Pacific region, its range extending from Madagascar to western, northern and eastern Australia, the Philippines, Indonesia and other western Pacific island groups. It is typically found in the intertidal zone of coral reefs and on rocky shores exposed to strong wave action. This is in contrast to C. gaimardii which prefers sheltered inlets and is found subtidally.
