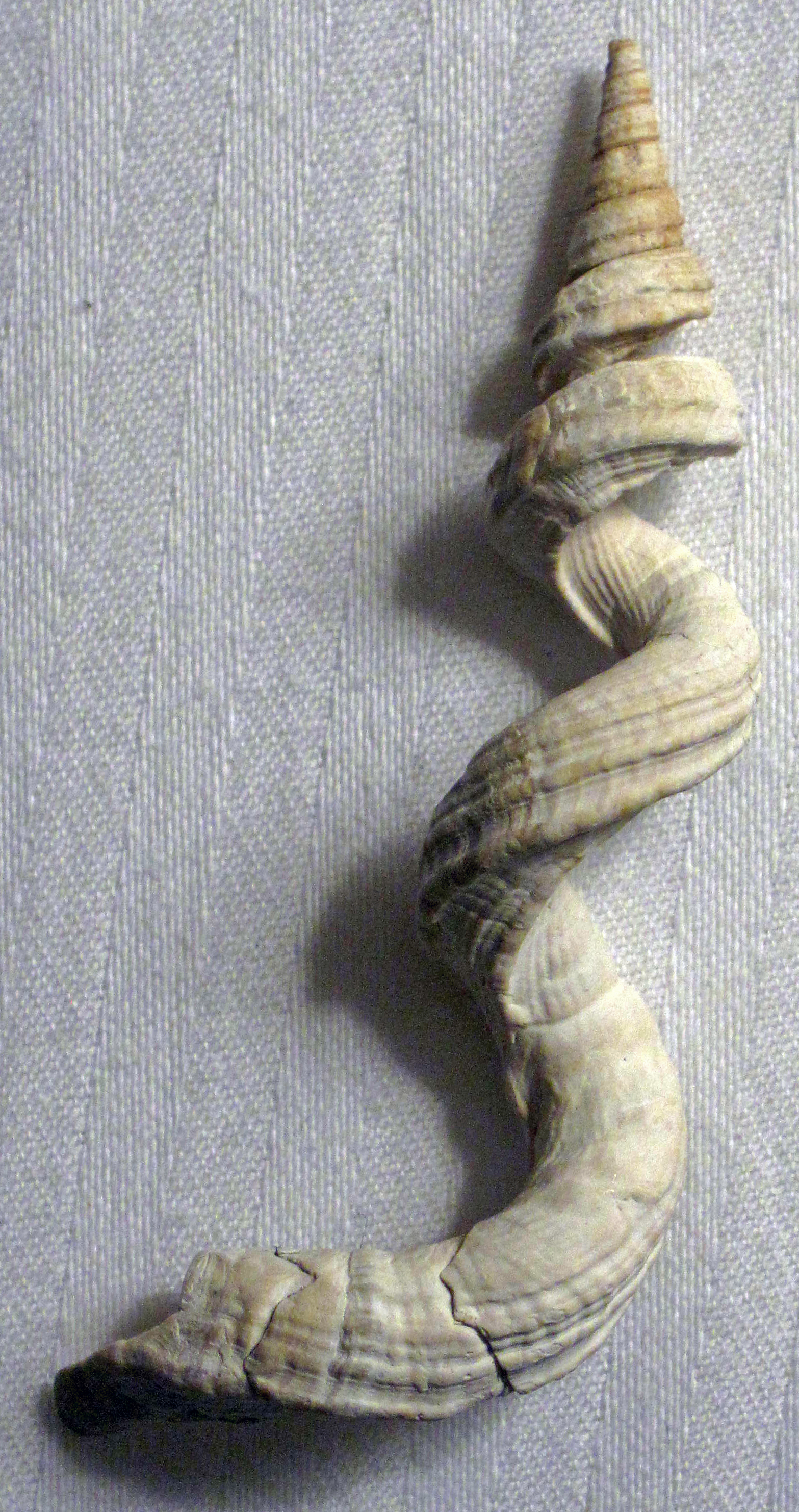

Scientific classification
- Kingdom: Animalia
- Phylum: Mollusca
- Class: Gastropoda
- Subclass: Caenogastropoda
- Order: incertae sedis
- Family: Turritellidae
- Genus: Vermicularia
- Species: V. fargoi

Binomial name
- Vermicularia fargoi Olsson, 1951

= Vermicularia fargoi =

Species of gastropod

Vermicularia fargoi is a species of sea snail, a marine gastropod mollusc in the family Turritellidae.

== Description ==
The maximum recorded shell length is 80 mm.

== Habitat ==
The minimum recorded depth for this species is 0 m; maximum recorded depth is 10 m.
