= Calcinus argus =

Scientific classification
- Domain: Eukaryota
- Kingdom: Animalia
- Phylum: Arthropoda
- Class: Malacostraca
- Order: Decapoda
- Suborder: Pleocyemata
- Infraorder: Anomura
- Family: Diogenidae
- Genus: Calcinus
- Species: C. argus

Binomial name
- Calcinus argus Wooster, 1984

Species of hermit crab

Calcinus argus, also known as the Argus hermit crab, is a species of hermit crabs in the family Diogenidae described by David Wooster in 1984. Originating from the Indo-West Pacific near Hawaii.

== Description ==
Calcinus argus is characterized by their unique colorization compared to other Calcinus species found in the same region. This organism features a unique, distinctly sized and spaced white spots across their three pereopods (walking legs) against a maroon shell. They typically have longer, slender, eye stalks, along with a less rounded carapace.

Calcinus argus has the segmented head, thorax, and abdomen, of the phylum Arthropoda. This organism has 5 pairs of legs as a member of the order Decopoda, with one pair being its chelipeds (claws), where its left claw is larger than the right. Their carapace can be lightly green to completely white, and their eyes are black with small white spots.

== Distribution & habitat ==
Calcinus argus origins is in Hawaii. They are rarely found in the geographic division Indo-West Pacific; in shallow waters ranging from Eastern Africa to the Hawaiian Islands. Calcinus argus specimens were found and examined in the Mariana islands, along with 11 other Calcinus species by David Wooster.

Calcinus argus can be found in intertidal depths from the surface to around 40m, enough exposure to moving, clean salt water, and never in the deeper waters, preferring the reef; with the sea surface temperature in the 25-30 °C range, and sea surface salinity at 30-35 PSU. Note: Records from 2003 to 2007, with 3 from 2017. Calcinus argus can be found in reef or near the reef in branches of Acropora coral or Pocillopora coral.

== Behavior ==
Calcinus argus will protect its soft abdomen with a variety of shells, and when disturbed they will retreat into their shells, and fall into the middles of coral reef.
