= Vermicularia radicula =

Scientific classification
- Kingdom: Animalia
- Phylum: Mollusca
- Class: Gastropoda
- Subclass: Caenogastropoda
- Order: incertae sedis
- Family: Turritellidae
- Genus: Vermicularia
- Species: V. radicula

Binomial name
- Vermicularia radicula (Stimpson, 1851)

Synonyms
- Vermetus radilula Stimpson, 1851; Vermiculus spiratus var. cinerea Môrch, 1861

Species of gastropod

Vermicularia radicula, common name the northern wormsnail, is a species of sea snail, a marine gastropod mollusc in the family Turritellidae.

== Description ==
The maximum recorded shell length is 61 mm.

== Habitat ==
Minimum recorded depth is 5.5 m. Maximum recorded depth is 18 m.
