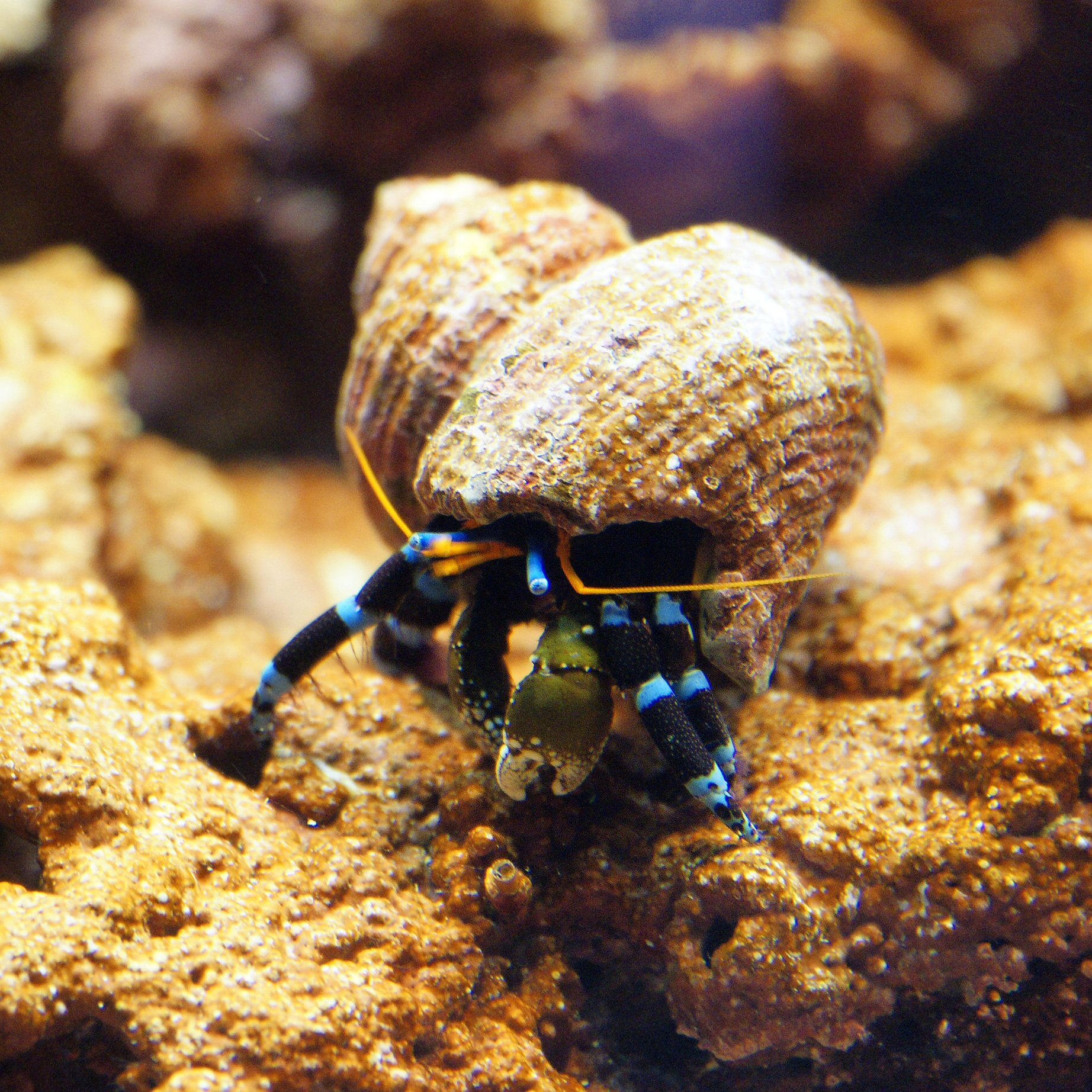
- Calcinus elegans

Scientific classification
- Domain: Eukaryota
- Kingdom: Animalia
- Phylum: Arthropoda
- Class: Malacostraca
- Order: Decapoda
- Suborder: Pleocyemata
- Infraorder: Anomura
- Family: Diogenidae
- Genus: Calcinus; Dana, 1851

Type species
- Cancer tibicen Herbst, 1791

= Calcinus =

Genus of crustaceans

Calcinus is a genus of hermit crabs in the family Diogenidae, containing the following species:

- Calcinus albengai Poupin & Lemaitre, 2003
- Calcinus anani Poupin & McLaughlin, 1998
- Calcinus argus Wooster, 1984
- Calcinus californiensis Bouvier, 1898
- Calcinus chilensis (H. Milne Edwards, 1836)
- Calcinus dapsiles Mogan, 1989
- Calcinus elegans (H. Milne-Edwards, 1836)
- Calcinus explorator Boone, 1930
- Calcinus fuscus Malay, Komai & Chan, 2012
- Calcinus gaimardii (H. Milne-Edwards, 1848)
- Calcinus gouti Poupin, 1997
- Calcinus guamensis Wooster, 1984
- Calcinus haigae Wooster, 1984
- Calcinus hakahau Poupin & McLaughlin, 1998
- Calcinus hazletti Haig & McLaughlin, 1984
- Calcinus imperialis Whitelegge, 1901
- Calcinus inconspicuus Morgan, 1991
- Calcinus isabellae Poupin, 1997
- Calcinus kurozumii Asakura & Tachikawa, 2000
- Calcinus laevimanus (Randall, 1840)
- Calcinus latens (Randall, 1840)
- Calcinus laurentae Haig & McLaughlin, 1984
- Calcinus lineapropodus Morgan & Forest, 1991
- Calcinus mclaughlinae Poupin & Bouchard, 2006
- Calcinus minutus Buitendijk, 1937
- Calcinus morgani Rahayu & Forest, 1999
- Calcinus nitidus Heller, 1865
- Calcinus obscurus Stimpson, 1859
- Calcinus orchidae Poupin, 1997
- Calcinus paradoxus Bouvier, 1922
- Calcinus pascuensis Haig, 1974
- Calcinus pictus (Owen, 1839)
- Calcinus pulcher Forest, 1958
- Calcinus revi Poupin & McLaughlin, 1998
- Calcinus rosaceus Heller, 1861
- Calcinus seurati Forest, 1951
- Calcinus shawi Poupin & Lemaitre, 2022
- Calcinus sirius Morgan, 1991
- Calcinus spicatus Forest, 1951
- Calcinus talismani A. Milne-Edwards & Bouvier, 1892
- Calcinus tibicen (Herbst, 1791)
- Calcinus tropdiomanus Lewinsohn, 1981
- Calcinus tubularis (Linnaeus, 1767)
- Calcinus urabaensis Campos & Lemaitre, 1994
- Calcinus vachoni Forest, 1958
- Calcinus vanninii Gherardi & McLaughlin, 1994
- Calcinus verrillii (Rathbun, 1901)
