= Calcinus hazletti =

Scientific classification
- Kingdom: Animalia
- Phylum: Arthropoda
- Clade: Pancrustacea
- Class: Malacostraca
- Order: Decapoda
- Suborder: Pleocyemata
- Infraorder: Anomura
- Family: Diogenidae
- Genus: Calcinus
- Species: C. hazletti

Binomial name
- Calcinus hazletti Haig & McLaughlin, 1984

Species of crab

Calcinus hazletti, commonly known as the Hawaiian whitefoot hermit, is a species of hermit crab in the family Diogenidae.
