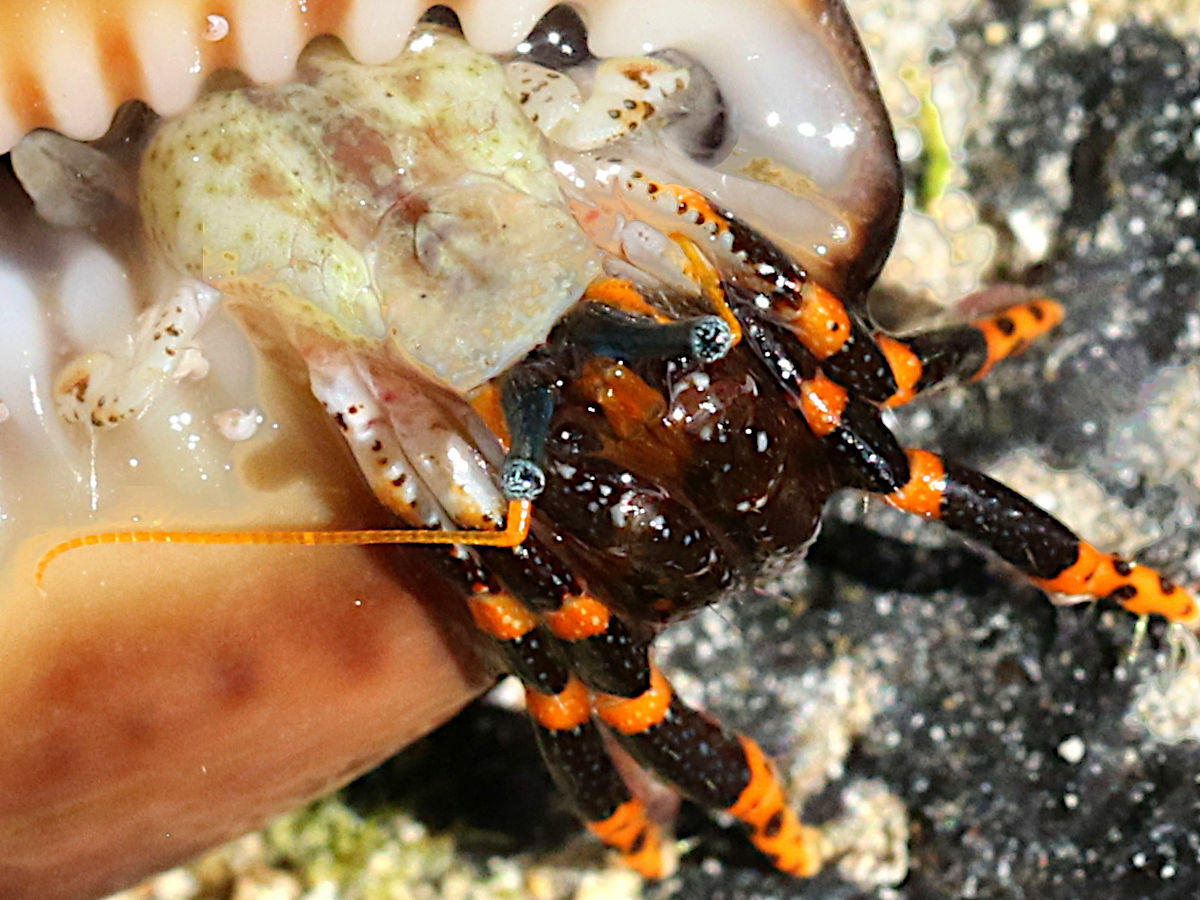

Scientific classification
- Kingdom: Animalia
- Phylum: Arthropoda
- Clade: Pancrustacea
- Class: Malacostraca
- Order: Decapoda
- Suborder: Pleocyemata
- Infraorder: Anomura
- Family: Diogenidae
- Genus: Calcinus
- Species: C. pictus

Binomial name
- Calcinus pictus (Owen, 1839)

= Calcinus pictus =

Species of crustacean

Calcinus pictus, commonly known as the painted hermit crab, is a species of hermit crab in the family Diogenidae, the "left-handed hermit crabs". The species is endemic to Hawaii.
