= Vermicularia bathyalis =

Scientific classification
- Kingdom: Animalia
- Phylum: Mollusca
- Class: Gastropoda
- Subclass: Caenogastropoda
- Order: incertae sedis
- Family: Turritellidae
- Genus: Vermicularia
- Species: V. bathyalis

Binomial name
- Vermicularia bathyalis Petuch, 2002

Species of gastropod

Vermicularia bathyalis is a species of sea snail, a marine gastropod mollusc in the family Turritellidae.

== Description ==
The maximum recorded shell length is 62 mm.

== Habitat ==
Minimum recorded depth is 400 m. Maximum recorded depth is 400 m.
