= Calcinus revi =

Scientific classification
- Domain: Eukaryota
- Kingdom: Animalia
- Phylum: Arthropoda
- Class: Malacostraca
- Order: Decapoda
- Suborder: Pleocyemata
- Infraorder: Anomura
- Family: Diogenidae
- Genus: Calcinus
- Species: C. revi

Binomial name
- Calcinus revi Poupin & McLaughlin, 1998

Species of crustaceans

Calcinus revi, commonly known as the white hermit crab, is a species of hermit crabs in the family Diogenidae.

== Description ==
Calcinus revi reaches up to 1.5 cm (0.59 in) in length. Its body is purely white, antennae are yellow and the eyes appear to have a color combination of black and blue.

== Distribution ==
The white hermit crab can be found in the Indo-West Pacific, including Hawaii, French Polynesia, South Pacific, South Japan, and Mariana Islands.

== Habitat ==
This species of hermit crab can be found in the intertidal zone and shallow waters up to 6 m (20 ft) in depth.
