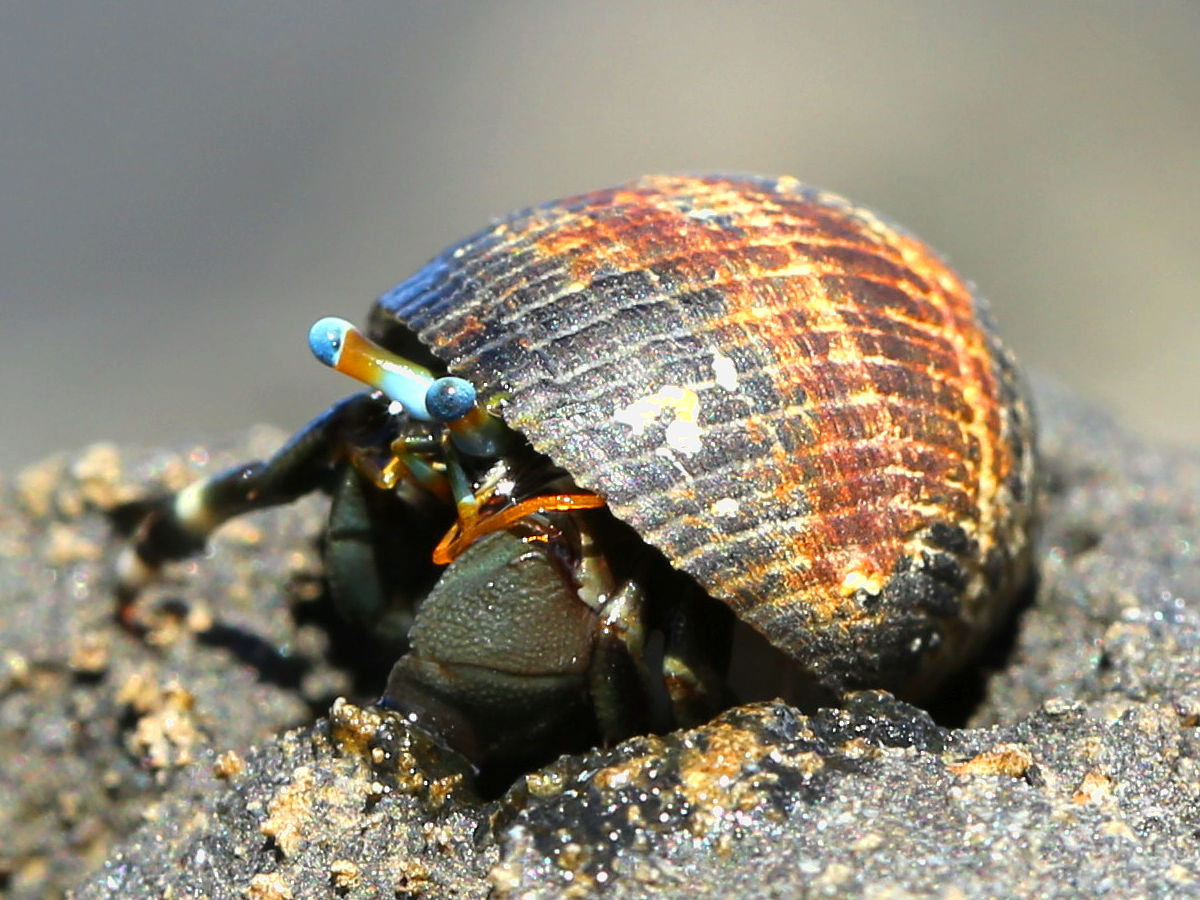

Scientific classification
- Kingdom: Animalia
- Phylum: Arthropoda
- Clade: Pancrustacea
- Class: Malacostraca
- Order: Decapoda
- Suborder: Pleocyemata
- Infraorder: Anomura
- Family: Diogenidae
- Genus: Calcinus
- Species: C. seurati

Binomial name
- Calcinus seurati Forest, 1951

= Calcinus seurati =

Species of crab

Calcinus seurati, commonly known as Seurat's hermit crab or whitebanded hermit, is a species of hermit crab in the family Diogenidae. It was first described by French carcinologist Jacques Forest in 1951. This species is found in rocky pools where they would be seen crawling out to the wet, algae-covered rocks. Calcinus seurati can be found in Indo-Pacific regions around the tropical area.

== Description ==
Calcinus seurati is known for its vibrant appearance, with shells often decorated with patterns like spots and bands. Walking legs banded black and white, claws light or dark gray. This species is a small to medium-sized hermit, growing up to 2 in (51 mm) in size. It is omnivorous, feeding on a variety of plant and animal matter. This crab exhibits phototaxis, possibly as a strategy to avoid predators.

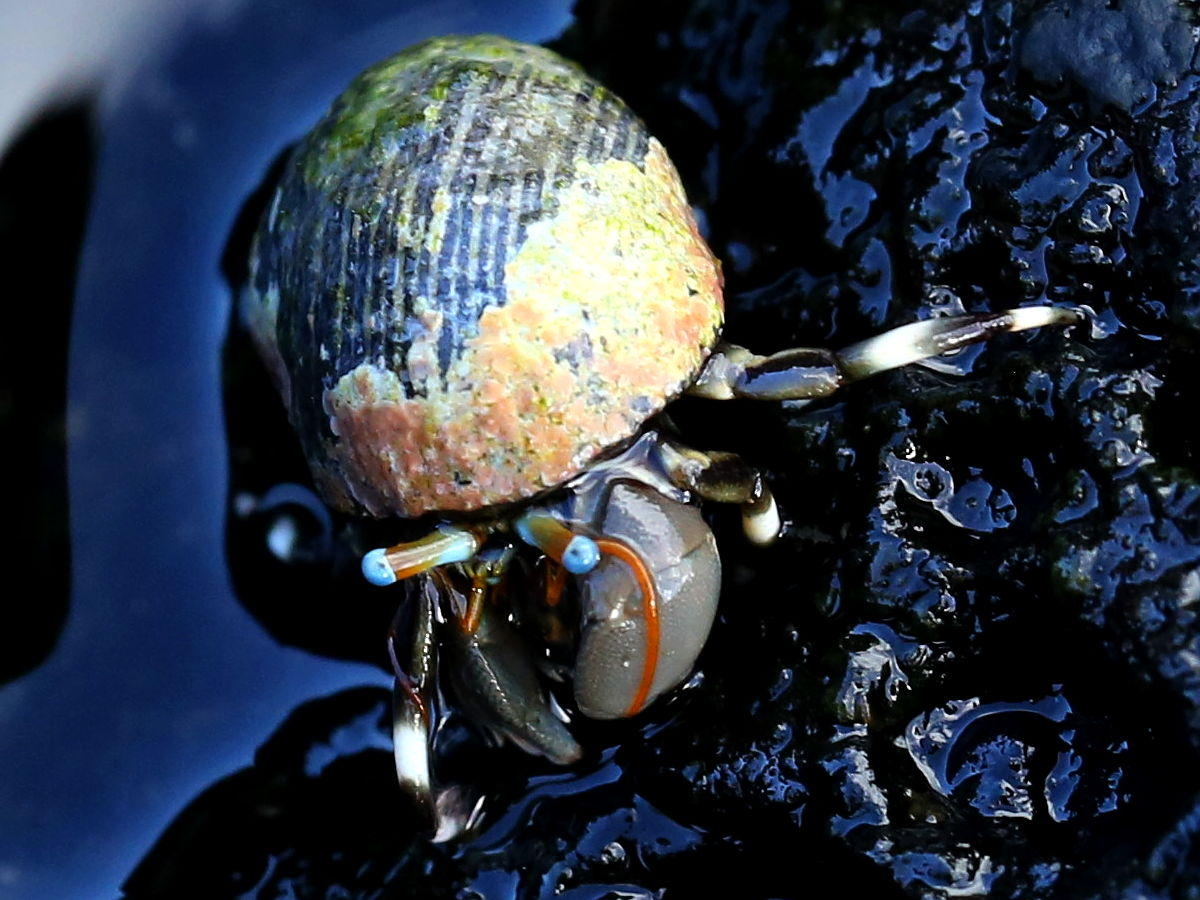
In Poipu, Hawaii

== Distribution and habitat ==
The whitebanded hermit crab is found primarily in tropical regions of the Indo-Pacific, including Taiwan, Hawaii, Guam, French Polynesia, and the Tuamotu Islands. It inhabits various coastal environments, including subtidal, sublittoral, and infralittoral zones as well as high intertidal pools. This hermit crab is typically found in areas where the water is calm and warm, often in rocky pools near the waterline, to depths of 5 m (16 ft).
