= Calcinus guamensis =

Scientific classification
- Domain: Eukaryota
- Kingdom: Animalia
- Phylum: Arthropoda
- Class: Malacostraca
- Order: Decapoda
- Suborder: Pleocyemata
- Infraorder: Anomura
- Family: Diogenidae
- Genus: Calcinus
- Species: C. guamensis

Binomial name
- Calcinus guamensis Wooster, 1984

Species of hermit crab

Calcinus guamensis is a species of hermit crab belonging to the Diogenidae family. First discovered by D.S. Wooster in 1982, this species primarily lives in the tropical waters of the Indo-Pacific region, including Guam and Hawaii. It is one of several species in the genus Calcinus, known for their uneven claws and reliance on gastropod shells for protection.

== Taxonomy and discovery ==
Calcinus guamensis was first collected and described by Daniel S. Wooster in 1982 during a study of the Mariana Islands. The species was named after Guam, where the original specimens were discovered. Wooster's research expanded the known diversity of the genus Calcinus in the Indo-Pacific region.

== Description ==
Calcinus guamensis is a small hermit crab with a maximum shell width of about 6 mm (0.24 in). It is easily recognized by its coloration of a mustard brown or olive that fades into white, with its walking legs dipped in black. Its uneven claws, with the left being significantly larger, are bluish-green and differ from its reddish-brown body. The walking legs are banded with alternating light and dark colors, and its beak is triangular and relatively short. The crab's left claw is used to block the entrance of its shell when under threat, providing an effective defense against predators—a behavior typical of many hermit crabs in the family Diogenidae.

== Ecology and behavior ==
Calcinus guamensis plays a vital role as a scavenger in reef ecosystems. It feeds on detritus, algae, and small invertebrates, helping to break down organic material and promoting nutrient cycling. Hermit crabs play a key role in reef ecosystems they are major contributors to the health and protection of coral reef by removing organic debris and preventing algae from overgrowing.

The species is nocturnal, becoming more active at night when it forages for food. It exhibits typical shell-swapping behavior, often competing with other hermit crabs for shells that are better suited to their size. Wooster described this as a very competitive challenge, where it creates aggressive behavior for individuals to obtain optimal shells.

== Distribution and habitat ==
This species inhabits shallow coral reefs and rocky environments in the Indo-Pacific region. It has been observed in Guam, Hawaii, and other parts of the Pacific. It is commonly found in deeper water areas (3–20 m or 10–66 ft) compared to other species of the Calcinus. Calcinus guamensis is particularly largely located in tide pools and surge zones, which offer food and protection from predators.
