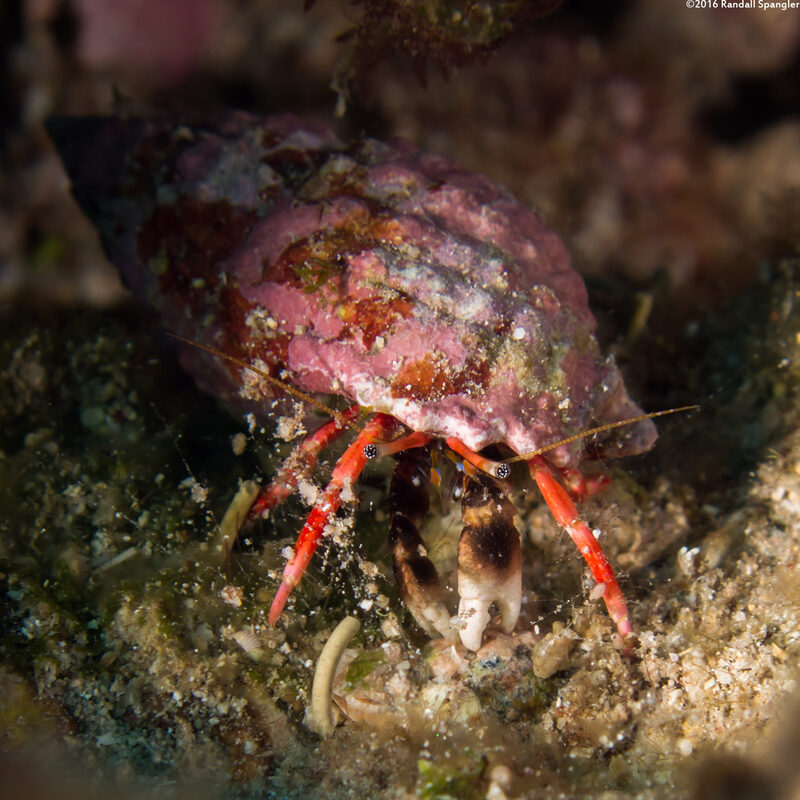

Scientific classification
- Domain: Eukaryota
- Kingdom: Animalia
- Phylum: Arthropoda
- Class: Malacostraca
- Order: Decapoda
- Suborder: Pleocyemata
- Infraorder: Anomura
- Family: Diogenidae
- Genus: Calcinus
- Species: C. laurentae

Binomial name
- Calcinus laurentae Haig & McLaughlin, 1984

= Calcinus laurentae =

Species of hermit crab

Calcinus laurentae is a species of left-handed hermit crab in the family Diogenidae. The common name for Calcinus laurentae is Laurent's Hermit Crab or Redleg calcinus. Calcinus laurentae are native to Hawaii and the Hawaiian word for hermit crab is unauna.

== Description ==
Their eyestalks are orange with white rings under their eyes. Their two large claw pinchers are brownish/black fading into white at the ends. Their walking legs are reddish/orange fading into pink at the ends. Their walking legs also have white rings near the joint segments, with tiny black tips at the end of each leg. They have yellow or orange antennae. Their eyes are black with numerous tiny white dots. Their size is tiny, around 1/4in or 0.75cm.

== Biology ==
In order to move around they crawl or use drag powered swimming. They reproduce through indirect sperm transfer between male and females. Courtship rituals involving touch and smell are common before mating. Like other hermit crabs, they cannot make their own shells and instead they most often live in discarded snail shells. Multiple Redleg calcinus have been observed sharing a single shell. They are nocturnal scavengers. As detritus feeders they consume mainly decaying organic matter.

== Distribution and habitat ==
Calcinus laurentae are native to Hawaii but can be found throughout the Central Pacific as well as near Australia. They are considered common and can be observed at popular Oahu dive spots such as the Haleiwa Trench, Sea Tiger, Kewalo Pipe, and Ke'ehi Pipe. They are a marine species that live below the intertidal zone, 20 ft or deeper. They can be found on the seafloor, in coral reefs, and in tidal areas. They are commonly observed in small caves, under rocks, and on branching corals.

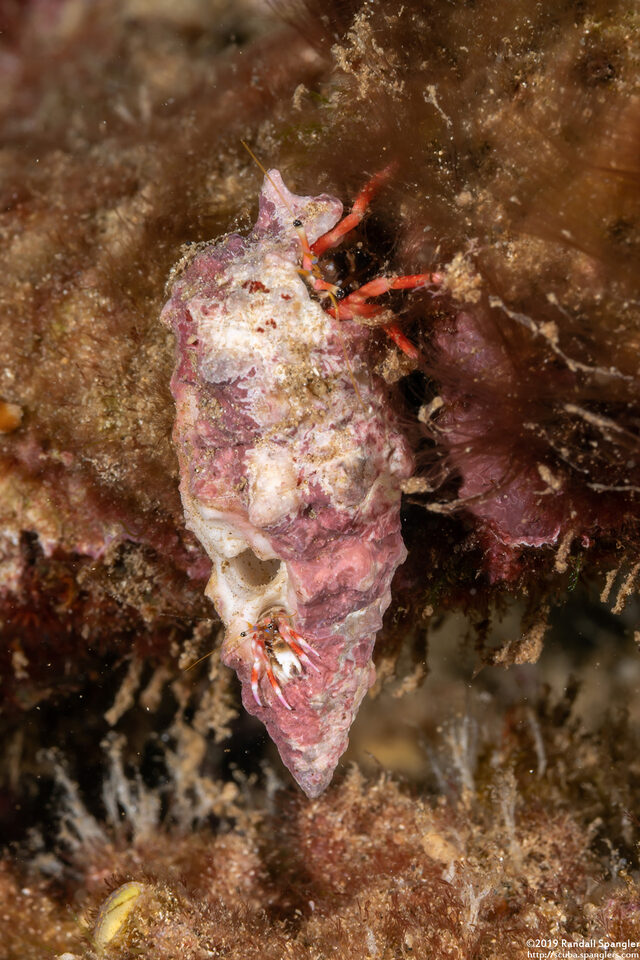
Two crabs sharing a shell
