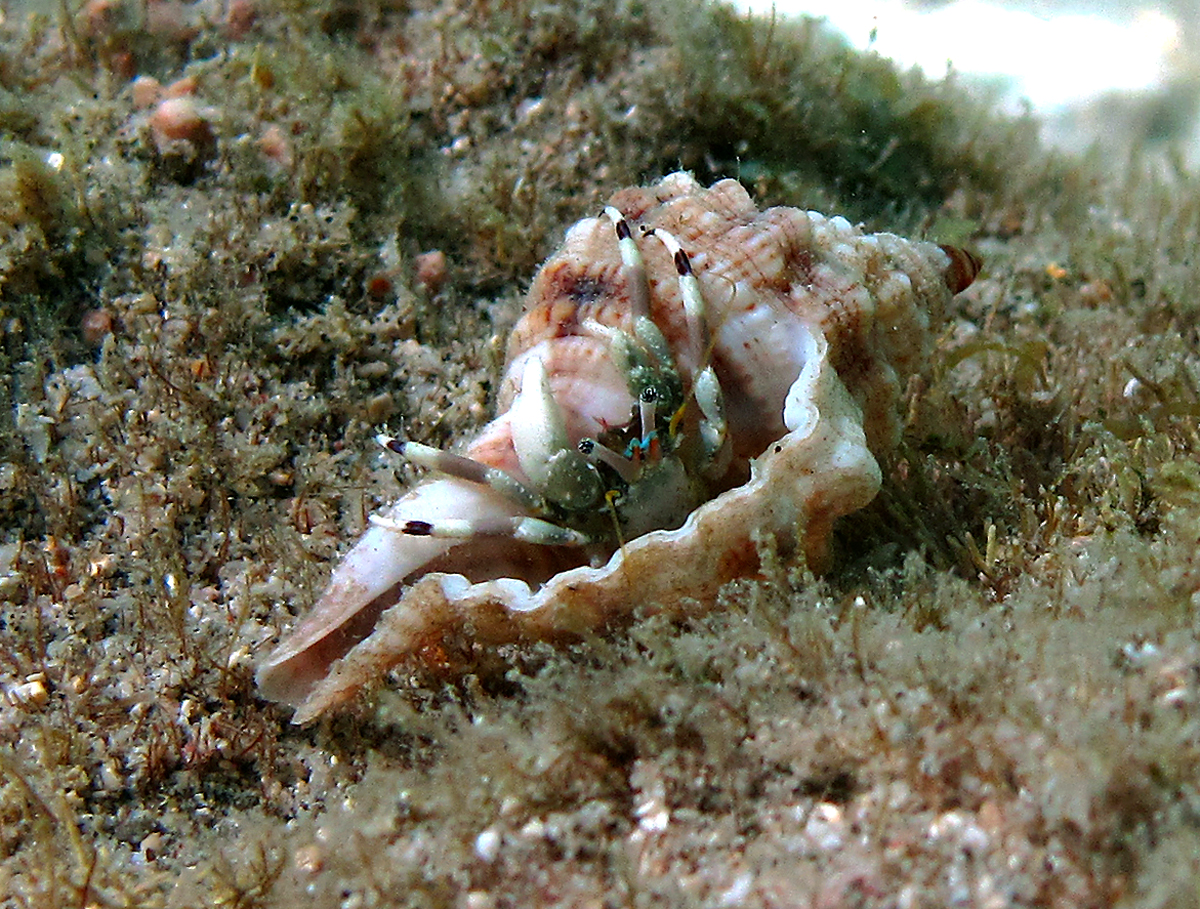

Scientific classification
- Kingdom: Animalia
- Phylum: Arthropoda
- Clade: Pancrustacea
- Class: Malacostraca
- Order: Decapoda
- Suborder: Pleocyemata
- Infraorder: Anomura
- Family: Diogenidae
- Genus: Calcinus
- Species: C. latens

Binomial name
- Calcinus latens (Randall, 1840)

= Calcinus latens =

Species of crab

Calcinus latens, the hidden hermit crab, is a species of hermit crab in the family Diogenidae.

== Description ==
Calcinus latens is a small hermit crab, ranging in shell size from 2 to 7 mm (0.08 to 0.28 in) long, distinguished by olive green bodies, dark-tipped legs, and varying-sized claws, with the left being larger than the right. There is significant sexual dimorphism within the species, with males and intersex hermit crabs typically larger in size than females. Reef ecosystems can provide little visibility, so the C. latens relies on chemosensory structures to explore, protect, and hide in its environment. Even with certain chemosensory abilities in its environment, the C. latens will frequently lose in competition for shells with another species in the same genus, Calcinus laevimanus.

== Distribution and habitat ==
Calcinus latens is a common hermit crab species distributed throughout the tropical Indo Pacific region, including areas such as Australia, Japan, the Eastern Coast of Africa, and Hawai'i. It inhabits coral reefs, hiding under rocks and rubble in intertidal and shallow subtidal zones, at depths up to 5 m (16 ft).
