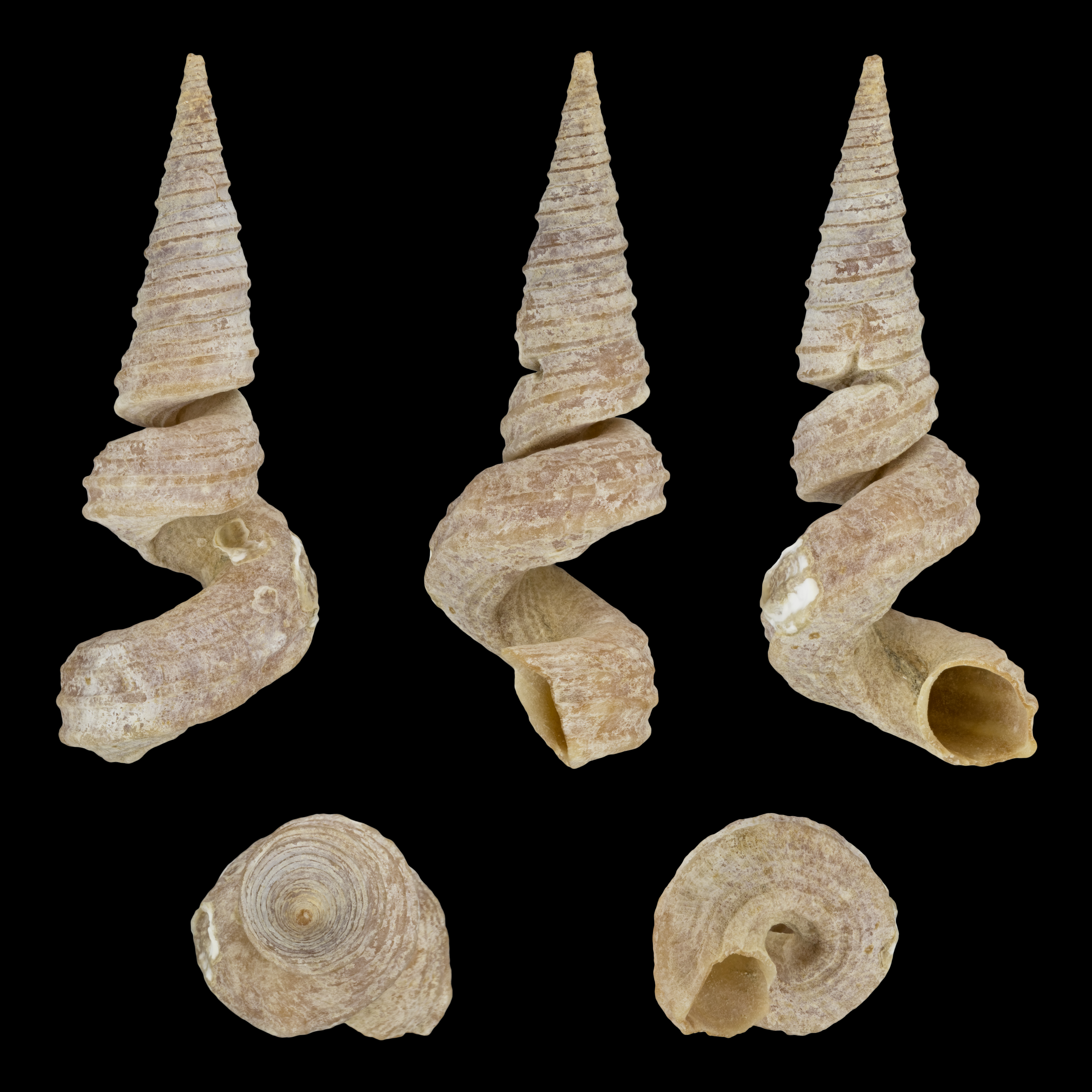

Scientific classification
- Kingdom: Animalia
- Phylum: Mollusca
- Class: Gastropoda
- Subclass: Caenogastropoda
- Order: incertae sedis
- Family: Turritellidae
- Genus: Vermicularia
- Species: V. spirata

Binomial name
- Vermicularia spirata (Philippi, 1836)

Synonyms
- Vermetus quadrangulus Philippi, 1848; Vermetus spiratus Philippi, 1836; Vermiculus spiratus (Philippi, 1836); Vermiculus spiratus var. bicarinata Môrch, 1861; Vermiculus spiratus var. melanosclera Môrch, 1861; Vermiculus spiratus var. quadrangularis Môrch, 1861; Vermiculus spiratus var. scalaris Môrch, 1861; Vermiculus spiratus var. teres Môrch, 1861; Vermiculus spiratus var. ungulina Môrch, 1861

= Vermicularia spirata =

Species of gastropod

Vermicularia spirata, common name the West Indian worm-shell or the West Indian wormsnail, is a species of sea snail, a marine gastropod mollusc in the family Turritellidae. Juveniles can move around, but larger individuals become sessile.

== Distribution ==
Vermicularia spirata occurs in shallow water in the northwestern Atlantic Ocean, the Caribbean Sea and the Gulf of Mexico. Its range includes Mexico, Cuba, Jamaica, the Cayman Islands, the Lesser Antilles and Puerto Rico.

== Description ==
The maximum recorded shell length is 90 mm.

== Habitat ==
The minimum recorded depth for this species is 3 m; the maximum recorded depth is 80 m.

== Biology ==
Vermicularia spirata is a filter feeder and is a protandrous hermaphrodite; individuals start their adult life as males, at which stage they are free-living, but later become females and attach themselves to various substrates. Many are found embedded in the tissues of the white encrusting sponge Geodia gibberosa.

Male individuals, being motile, are able to move to the vicinity of the aperture of the sessile females before liberating sperm into the water. Capsules containing eggs are brooded in the mantle cavities of the females. The ova are about 300μm in diameter and the veliger larvae that hatch have two and a half whorls of shell and are about 600μm long. These crawl or swim away and soon undergo metamorphosis into juveniles which are all males. They feed on phytoplankton and grow rapidly.

In Bermuda, the endemic hermit crab Calcinus verrillii sometimes uses the vacated tube of Vermicularia spirata as a home, even though it is non-mobile.
