= Callostracum gracile =

Scientific classification
- Kingdom: Animalia
- Phylum: Mollusca
- Class: Gastropoda
- Subclass: Caenogastropoda
- Order: incertae sedis
- Family: Turritellidae
- Genus: Callostracum
- Species: C. gracile

Binomial name
- Callostracum gracile (Maltzan, 1883)

Synonyms
- Smithia gracilis Maltzan, 1883; Vermicularia gracilis (Maltzan, 1883)

Species of gastropod

Callostracum gracile is a species of sea snail, a marine gastropod mollusk in the family Turritellidae.
