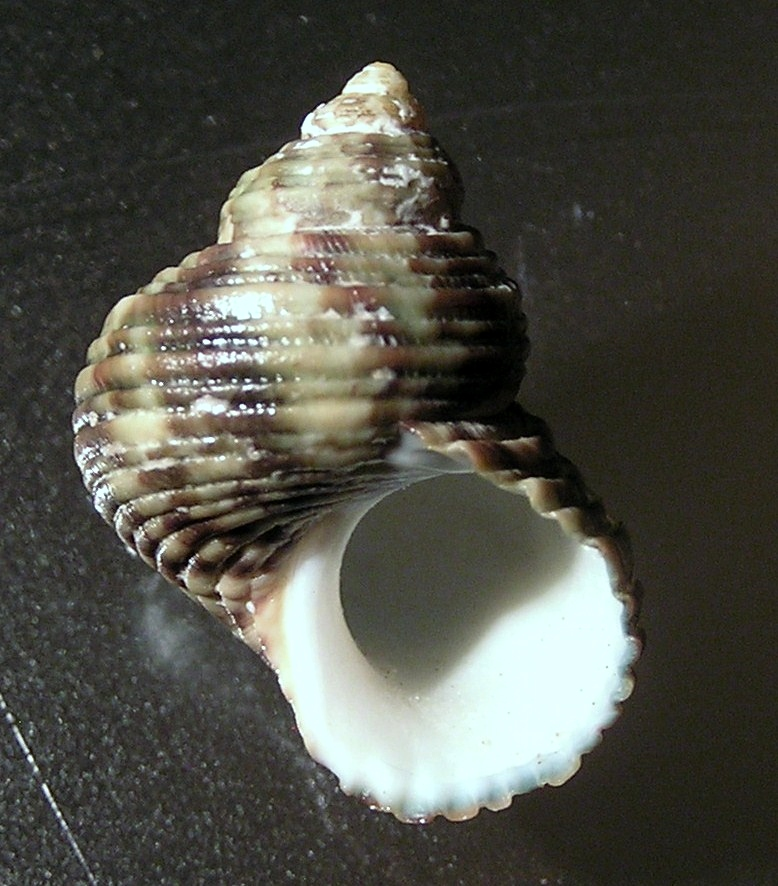
- Apertural view of a shell of Turbo sandwicensis

Scientific classification
- Kingdom: Animalia
- Phylum: Mollusca
- Class: Gastropoda
- Subclass: Vetigastropoda
- Order: Trochida
- Family: Turbinidae
- Genus: Turbo
- Species: T. sandwicensis

Binomial name
- Turbo sandwicensis (Pease, 1861)

Synonyms
- Turbo argyrostomus sandwicensis (Pease, 1861)

= Turbo sandwicensis =

Species of gastropod

Turbo sandwicensis, common name the Hawaiian top shell, is a species of sea snail, a marine gastropod mollusk in the family Turbinidae, the turban snails.

== Description ==
The length of the shell varies between 15 mm and 45 mm. The shell is ovately turbinated, slightly perforated, somewhat tubulous and spirally ridged. The ridges are smooth alternately rather smaller, squamose. The scales are most prominent on the body whorl. The interstices between the ridges are finely imbricately laminated. The body whorl is somewhat angulated at the upper part. The color pattern of the shell is green, marbled and variegated with dark brownish red.

== Distribution ==
This species occurs in the Pacific Ocean off Hawaii.

== Habitat ==
Turbo sandwicensis lives in shallow coastal waters of the Hawaiian Islands and can be found under rocks at a depth of approximately 60 ft (18 m).
