= Calcinus verrillii =

Scientific classification
- Kingdom: Animalia
- Phylum: Arthropoda
- Clade: Pancrustacea
- Class: Malacostraca
- Order: Decapoda
- Suborder: Pleocyemata
- Infraorder: Anomura
- Family: Diogenidae
- Genus: Calcinus
- Species: C. verrillii

Binomial name
- Calcinus verrillii Rathbun

Synonyms
- Clibanarius verrillii Rathbun, 1901

Species of crustacean

Calcinus verrillii, commonly known as Verrill's hermit crab, is a species of hermit crab in the genus Calcinus which is endemic to Bermuda. It was first described by the American zoologist Mary J. Rathbun and named in honour of the American zoologist Addison Emery Verrill, who spent much time with his students studying the geology and marine fauna of Bermuda.

Although this hermit crab species generally inhabits the discarded shell of a free-living gastropod mollusc, it sometimes makes use of the empty, tube-like shells of certain gastropod mollusc species while the tube is permanently cemented to rocks in the reef.

== Description ==
Like other crabs in the genus Calcinus, C. verrillii has a robust, calcified carapace, eight thoracic segments and six or seven abdominal segments. The carapace and legs are spotted with purple and orange, the eyes have slender eyestalks and the front three pairs of walking legs are smooth and hairless. The soft abdomen is coiled and fits into the mollusc shell which the hermit crab uses for protection, the uropods at the tip of the abdomen gripping the inside of the shell.

== Distribution and habitat ==
Calcinus verrillii is native to Bermuda and does not occur naturally anywhere else. It is mostly found in the subtidal zone and has been found as deep as 110 metres (630 ft). It is uncommon in intertidal areas and rock pools but is abundant on reefs and rocks with strong water movement.

== Ecology ==
As a hermit crab, Calcinus verrillii needs to find suitable empty shells of gastropod molluscs in which to live as it grows. It commonly inhabits shells of Cerithium litteratum, but empty shells can sometimes be in short supply. On some occasions the hermit crab takes up abode in the calcified tube of the vermetid gastropod Spiroglyphus irregularis. It also sometimes uses the tubes of the turritellids Vermicularia knorrii and Vermicularia spirata. These tubes are normally attached to rocks, and when this is the case, the hermit crab no longer has freedom of movement to gather fragments of algae off the rock or scavenge for its food. Instead the crab becomes a filter feeder. The advantages to the crab in making use of such a tube-like shell is that it is less likely to be swept off the rocks by strong water movements, and plenty of food may be brought to it by the current. Female C. verrillii grow larger than males, and are more likely to occupy tube shells.
