= C. tricolor =

C. tricolor may refer to:

- Caloptilia tricolor a moth species found in China
- Ciliopagurus tricolor, a hermit crab species native to Madagascar
- Clibanarius tricolor, a hermit crab species found in shallow water of the Caribbean Sea
- Convolvulus tricolor, the dwarf morning glory, a plant species native to the Mediterranean Basin

== See also ==
- Tricolor (disambiguation)
