= Ciliopagurus tenebrarum =

Scientific classification
- Domain: Eukaryota
- Kingdom: Animalia
- Phylum: Arthropoda
- Class: Malacostraca
- Order: Decapoda
- Suborder: Pleocyemata
- Infraorder: Anomura
- Family: Diogenidae
- Genus: Ciliopagurus
- Species: C. tenebrarum

Binomial name
- Ciliopagurus tenebrarum (Alcock, 1905)

Synonyms
- Aniculus tenebrarum Alcock, 1905; Trizopagurus tenebrarum (Alcock, 1905)

Species of crustacean

Ciliopagurus tenebrarum is a species of hermit crab native to Cape Comorin.
