= Ciliopagurus caparti =

Scientific classification
- Domain: Eukaryota
- Kingdom: Animalia
- Phylum: Arthropoda
- Class: Malacostraca
- Order: Decapoda
- Suborder: Pleocyemata
- Infraorder: Anomura
- Family: Diogenidae
- Genus: Ciliopagurus
- Species: C. caparti

Binomial name
- Ciliopagurus caparti (Forest, 1952)

Synonyms
- Trizopagurus caparti Forest, 1952

Species of crustacean

Ciliopagurus caparti is a species of hermit crab native to South East Atlantic.
