= Ciliopagurus shebae =

Scientific classification
- Domain: Eukaryota
- Kingdom: Animalia
- Phylum: Arthropoda
- Class: Malacostraca
- Order: Decapoda
- Suborder: Pleocyemata
- Infraorder: Anomura
- Family: Diogenidae
- Genus: Ciliopagurus
- Species: C. shebae

Binomial name
- Ciliopagurus shebae Lewinsohn, 1969

Species of crustacean

Ciliopagurus shebae is a species of hermit crab native to Madagascar, the Red Sea, Réunion, the Seychelles, and the West Indian Ocean.
