= Ciliopagurus krempfi =

Scientific classification
- Domain: Eukaryota
- Kingdom: Animalia
- Phylum: Arthropoda
- Class: Malacostraca
- Order: Decapoda
- Suborder: Pleocyemata
- Infraorder: Anomura
- Family: Diogenidae
- Genus: Ciliopagurus
- Species: C. krempfi

Binomial name
- Ciliopagurus krempfi Forest, 1952

Species of crustacean

Ciliopagurus krempfi is a species of hermit crab from the Indo-Pacific.
