= Ciliopagurus grandis =

Scientific classification
- Kingdom: Animalia
- Phylum: Arthropoda
- Class: Malacostraca
- Order: Decapoda
- Suborder: Pleocyemata
- Infraorder: Anomura
- Family: Diogenidae
- Genus: Ciliopagurus
- Species: C. grandis

Binomial name
- Ciliopagurus grandis Komai, Reshmi & Kumar, 2012

Species of crustacean

Ciliopagurus grandis is a species of hermit crab in the genus Ciliopagurus. It was discovered in Kerala, India in 2012.
