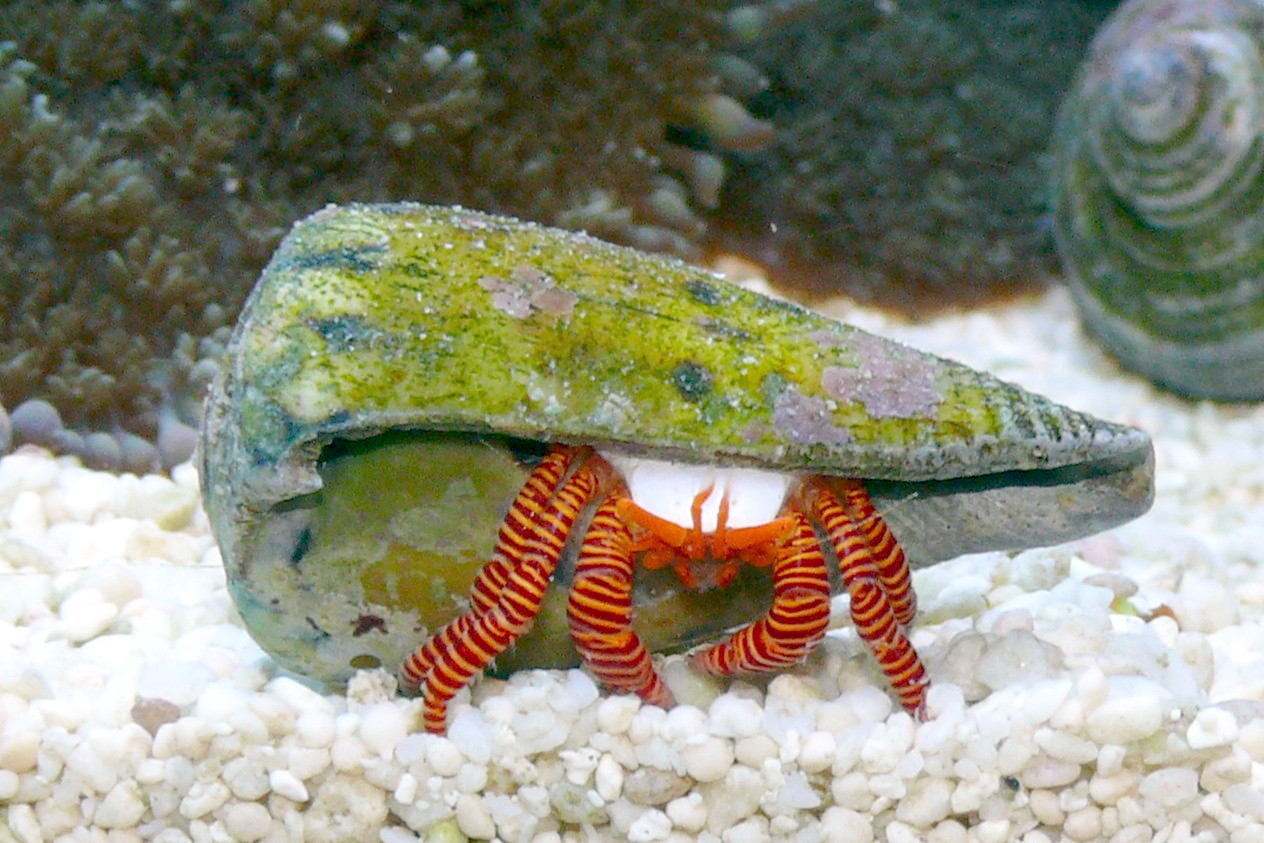

Scientific classification
- Kingdom: Animalia
- Phylum: Arthropoda
- Clade: Pancrustacea
- Class: Malacostraca
- Order: Decapoda
- Suborder: Pleocyemata
- Infraorder: Anomura
- Family: Diogenidae
- Genus: Ciliopagurus
- Species: C. strigatus

Binomial name
- Ciliopagurus strigatus (Herbst, 1804)

Synonyms
- Cancer strigatus Herbst, 1804; Pagurus strigatus (Herbst, 1804); Aniculus strigatus (Herbst, 1804); Trizopagurus strigatus (Herbst, 1804); Pagurus annulipes H. Milne-Edwards, 1848

= Halloween hermit crab =

Species of crustacean

The Halloween hermit crab (Ciliopagurus strigatus), also known as the striped hermit crab or orange-legged hermit crab, is a brightly colored species of aquatic hermit crab in the family Diogenidae. Besides its ability to routinely clean algae in aquaria, the Halloween hermit crab's festive striped coloration also appeals to enthusiasts; it is considered the most brightly colored hermit crab in normal aquarium use.

== Characteristics ==
The Halloween hermit crab is commonly found along coral substrates in the ocean, along sandy areas surrounding reefs, but not typically on top of the reefs, in shallow (less than 50 feet or 15 metres) tropical, coastal waters. It is native to the Indo-Pacific region, including the Red Sea and Hawaii. It is very similar in appearance to three other species in the same genus: C. tricolor, C. vakovako, and C. galzini, only distinguishable by the color of its striae.

The Halloween hermit crab typically grows to 2 inches (5.1 cm) in length, which is fairly large in comparison to other hermit crabs. It has a noticeably flattened, pure white shield, about .315 inches (8 mm) long. It is a nocturnal species, and has been described as "conspicuous". It lives primarily in empty cone shells, mainly those of snails or tritons. Like other hermit crabs, it wears shells to protect itself from predators. Its ocular peduncles and antennae are a solid orange and the antennal flagella are transparent. The propodus has parallel ridges on the palm, with similar ridges on the dactyls (the movable part of the pincers). The Halloween hermit crab can live for up to 10 years.

=== Coloration ===
The Halloween hermit crab is well known for its distinct and vibrant coloration. It has been described as an unusual hermit crab and the brightest of the hermit crabs typically available, with vividly colored walking legs, a red body, and alternating horizontal bright orange and white bands, giving it the likeness of the festive colors of Halloween. These characteristics make the Halloween hermit crab attractive to aquarists.

=== Diet ===
The Halloween hermit crab is omnivorous and a scavenger, eating nearly anything that appears in its environment, including small animals. It feeds on live and dead animal material, including filamentous algae and detritus. If a Halloween hermit crab's shell is too small, it may attack a snail for a larger shell. The Halloween hermit crab can eat quickly.

== Use in aquaria ==
Aquarium owners may use the Halloween hermit crab because it is visually unlike other aquarium-cleaning crabs. It can eat any leftover food that settles along the bottom, sifts through the sand, which aerates the aquarium substrate, and is well known to eat cyanobacteria, unsightly brown bacteria, and filamentous green algae efficiently. Because it can become aggressive towards other tank animals and may even kill fish and other invertebrates, feeding it meats, such as clams, mussels, scallops and shrimp along with various vegetation may reduce this behavior. Overall, it can support a healthy aquarium environment.
