= Ciliopagurus obesus =

Ciliopagurus obesus Temporal range: Rupelian

Scientific classification
- Kingdom: Animalia
- Phylum: Arthropoda
- Class: Malacostraca
- Order: Decapoda
- Suborder: Pleocyemata
- Infraorder: Anomura
- Family: Diogenidae
- Genus: Ciliopagurus
- Species: †C. obesus

Binomial name
- †Ciliopagurus obesus Van Bakel, Jagt & Fraaije, 2003

Extinct species of crustacean

Ciliopagurus obesus is a fossil species of hermit crab, described from Rupelian (Oligocene) sediments at Sint-Niklaas, Belgium.
