= Ciliopagurus haigae =

Scientific classification
- Kingdom: Animalia
- Phylum: Arthropoda
- Clade: Pancrustacea
- Class: Malacostraca
- Order: Decapoda
- Suborder: Pleocyemata
- Infraorder: Anomura
- Family: Diogenidae
- Genus: Ciliopagurus
- Species: C. haigae

Binomial name
- Ciliopagurus haigae Forest, 1995

Species of crustacean

Ciliopagurus haigae is a species of hermit crab native to Tanzania.
