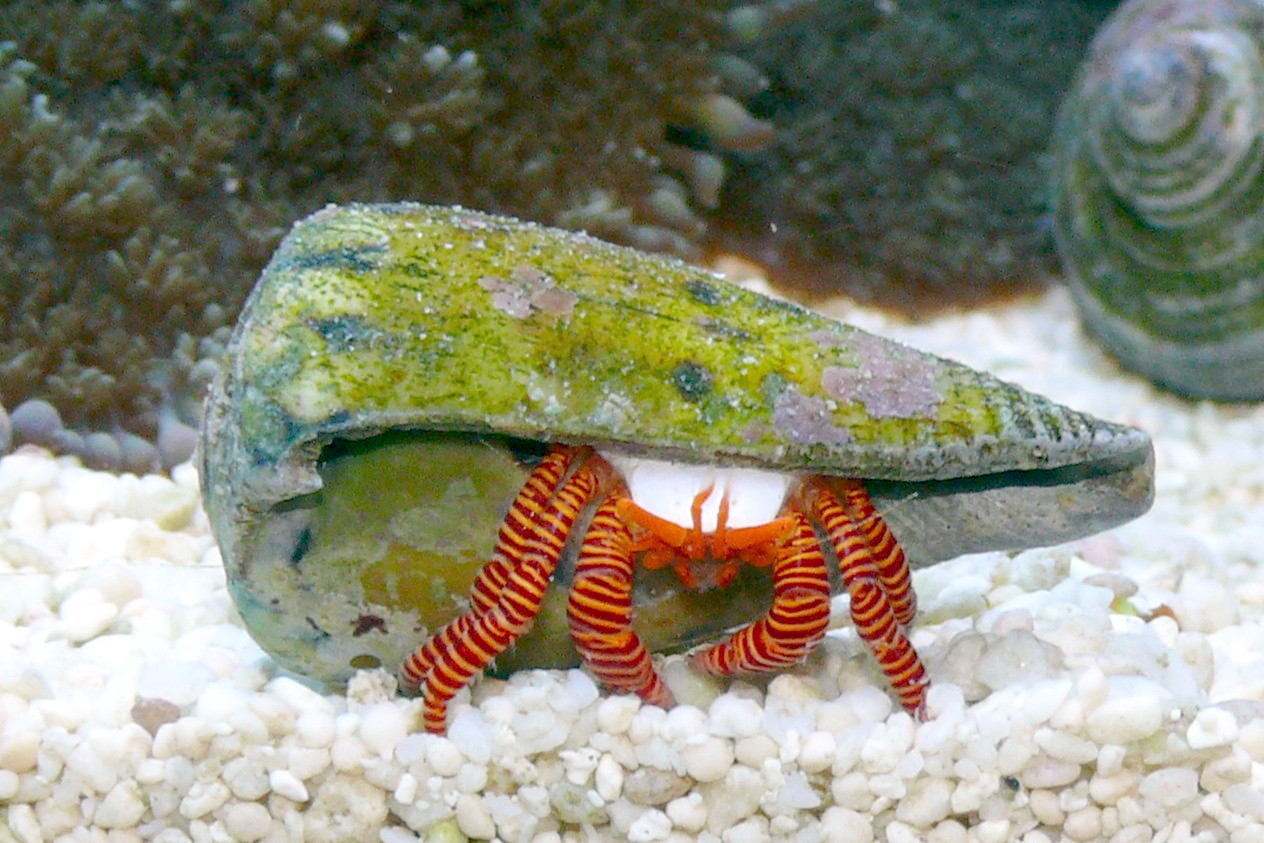
- Halloween hermit crab, C. strigatus

Scientific classification
- Domain: Eukaryota
- Kingdom: Animalia
- Phylum: Arthropoda
- Class: Malacostraca
- Order: Decapoda
- Suborder: Pleocyemata
- Infraorder: Anomura
- Family: Diogenidae
- Genus: Ciliopagurus; Forest, 1995

Type species
- Cancer strigatus Herbst, 1804

= Ciliopagurus =

Ciliopagurus Temporal range: Rupelian–Recent

Genus of crustaceans

Ciliopagurus is a genus of hermit crabs, of the family Diogenidae, which are sometimes referred to as the "left-handed hermit crabs", because in contrast to most other hermit crabs, the left chela (claw) is enlarged instead of the right. They are found in the Indo-Pacific region and in the eastern Atlantic Ocean.

== Species ==
- Ciliopagurus albatrossi Forest, 1995
- Ciliopagurus alcocki Forest, 1995
- Ciliopagurus babai Forest, 1995
- Ciliopagurus caparti (Forest, 1952)
- Ciliopagurus galzini Poupin & Malay, 2009
- Ciliopagurus grandis Komai, Reshmi & Kumar, 2012
- Ciliopagurus haigae Forest, 1995
- Ciliopagurus hawaiiensis (McLaughlin & Baily-Brock, 1975)
- Ciliopagurus krempfi (Forest, 1952)
- Ciliopagurus liui Forest, 1995
- Ciliopagurus macrolepis Forest, 1995
- Ciliopagurus major Forest, 1995
- †Ciliopagurus obesus van Bakel, Jagt & Fraaije, 2003
- Ciliopagurus pacificus Forest, 1995
- Ciliopagurus plessisi Forest, 1995
- Ciliopagurus shebae (Lewinsohn, 1969)
- Ciliopagurus strigatus (Herbst, 1804)
- †Ciliopagurus substriatiformis (Lorenthey, 1929)
- Ciliopagurus tenebrarum (Alcock, 1905)
- Ciliopagurus tricolor Forest, 1995
- Ciliopagurus vakovako Poupin, 2001
