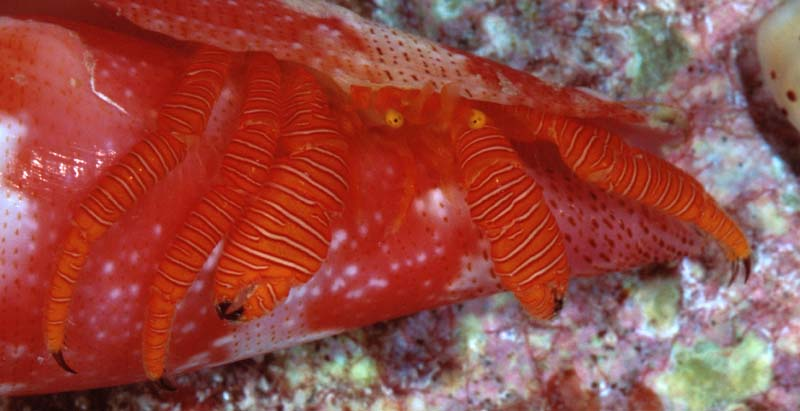

Scientific classification
- Domain: Eukaryota
- Kingdom: Animalia
- Phylum: Arthropoda
- Class: Malacostraca
- Order: Decapoda
- Suborder: Pleocyemata
- Infraorder: Anomura
- Family: Diogenidae
- Genus: Ciliopagurus
- Species: C. galzini

Binomial name
- Ciliopagurus galzini Poupin & Malay, 2009

= Ciliopagurus galzini =

Species of crustacean

Ciliopagurus galzini is a species of hermit crab. It is one of four species in the "strigatus complex"; it resembles C. strigatus, with the most prominent difference being coloration. It is common in the shallow intertidal waters of the Tuamotus.
