= Ciliopagurus substriatiformis =

Ciliopagurus substriatiformis Temporal range: Middle Miocene

Scientific classification
- Kingdom: Animalia
- Phylum: Arthropoda
- Class: Malacostraca
- Order: Decapoda
- Suborder: Pleocyemata
- Infraorder: Anomura
- Family: Diogenidae
- Genus: Ciliopagurus
- Species: †C. substriatiformis

Binomial name
- †Ciliopagurus substriatiformis Lorenthey, 1929

Extinct species of crustacean

Ciliopagurus substriatiformis was a species of hermit crab that existed during the Badenian stage (Middle Miocene).
