= Ciliopagurus vakovako =

Scientific classification
- Domain: Eukaryota
- Kingdom: Animalia
- Phylum: Arthropoda
- Class: Malacostraca
- Order: Decapoda
- Suborder: Pleocyemata
- Infraorder: Anomura
- Family: Diogenidae
- Genus: Ciliopagurus
- Species: C. vakovako

Binomial name
- Ciliopagurus vakovako Poupin, 2001

Species of crustacean

Ciliopagurus vakovako is a species of hermit crab native to the Marquesas Islands. It is typically found at a depth no lower than 57 metres (187 ft). C. vakovako appears to be a vicariant of C. strigatus, a species widespread throughout the Indo-pacific region.

The species name vakovako is a Marquesan word meaning striped, which is an allusion to the transverse rings on the legs.
