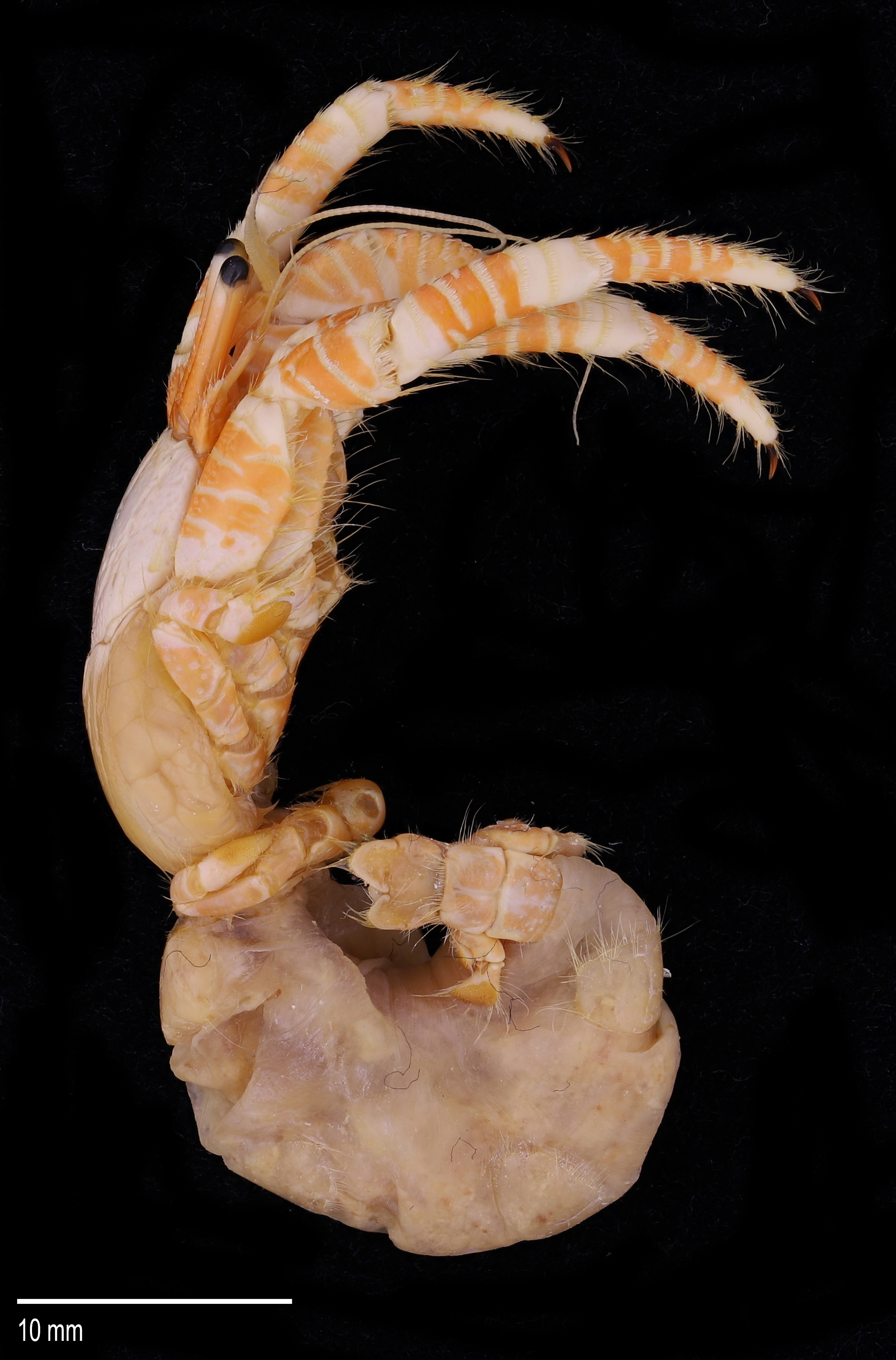

Scientific classification
- Domain: Eukaryota
- Kingdom: Animalia
- Phylum: Arthropoda
- Class: Malacostraca
- Order: Decapoda
- Suborder: Pleocyemata
- Infraorder: Anomura
- Family: Diogenidae
- Genus: Ciliopagurus
- Species: C. pacificus

Binomial name
- Ciliopagurus pacificus Forest, 1995

= Ciliopagurus pacificus =

Species of crustacean

Ciliopagurus pacificus is a species of hermit crab native to French Polynesia.
