= Ciliopagurus tricolor =

Scientific classification
- Domain: Eukaryota
- Kingdom: Animalia
- Phylum: Arthropoda
- Class: Malacostraca
- Order: Decapoda
- Suborder: Pleocyemata
- Infraorder: Anomura
- Family: Diogenidae
- Genus: Ciliopagurus
- Species: C. tricolor

Binomial name
- Ciliopagurus tricolor Forest, 1995

Species of crustacean

Ciliopagurus tricolor is a species of hermit crab native to Madagascar. It is one of four species in the "strigatus complex", having morphological similarities to C. strigatus, with the most prominent variance being coloration.
