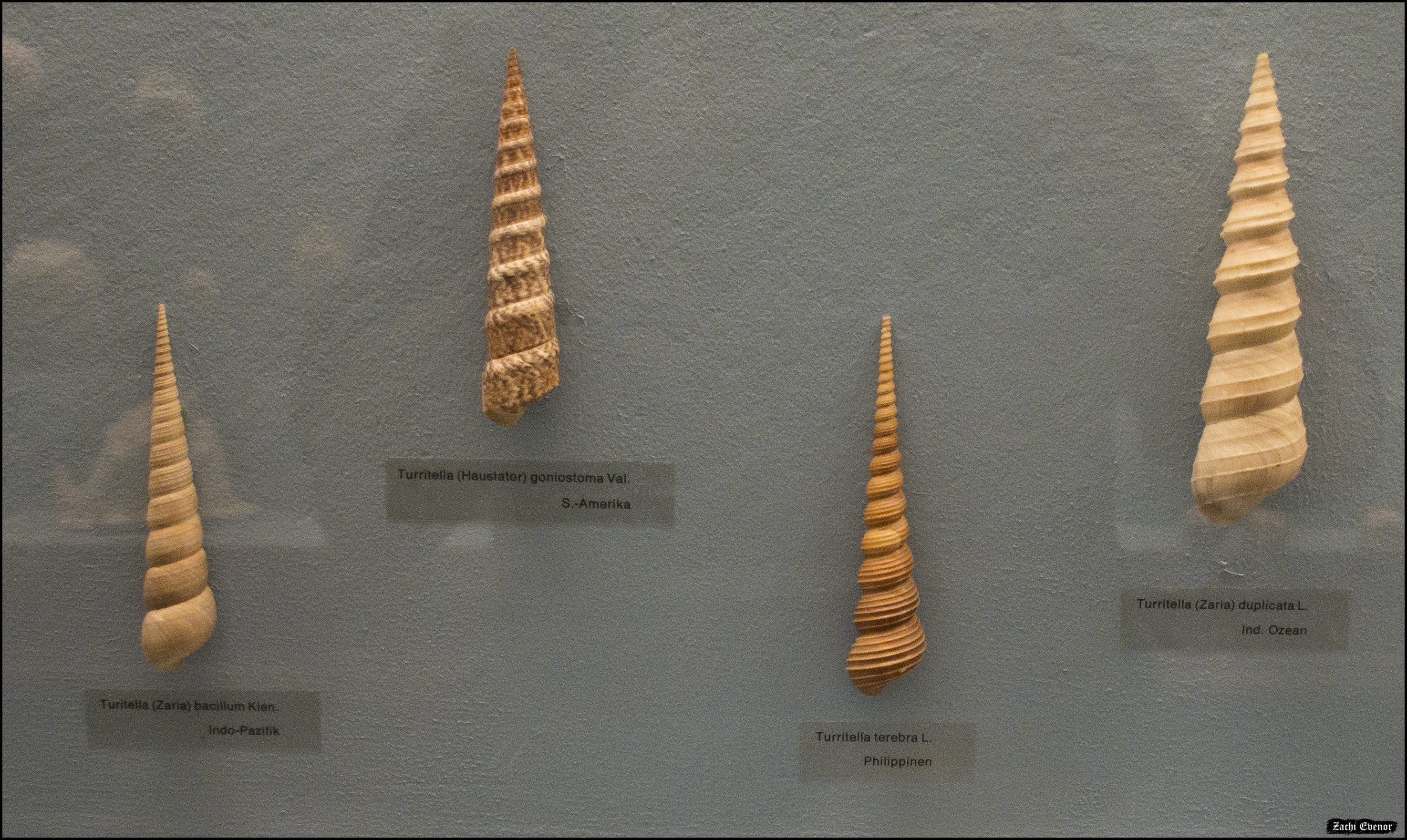
- Shells of different Turritella species
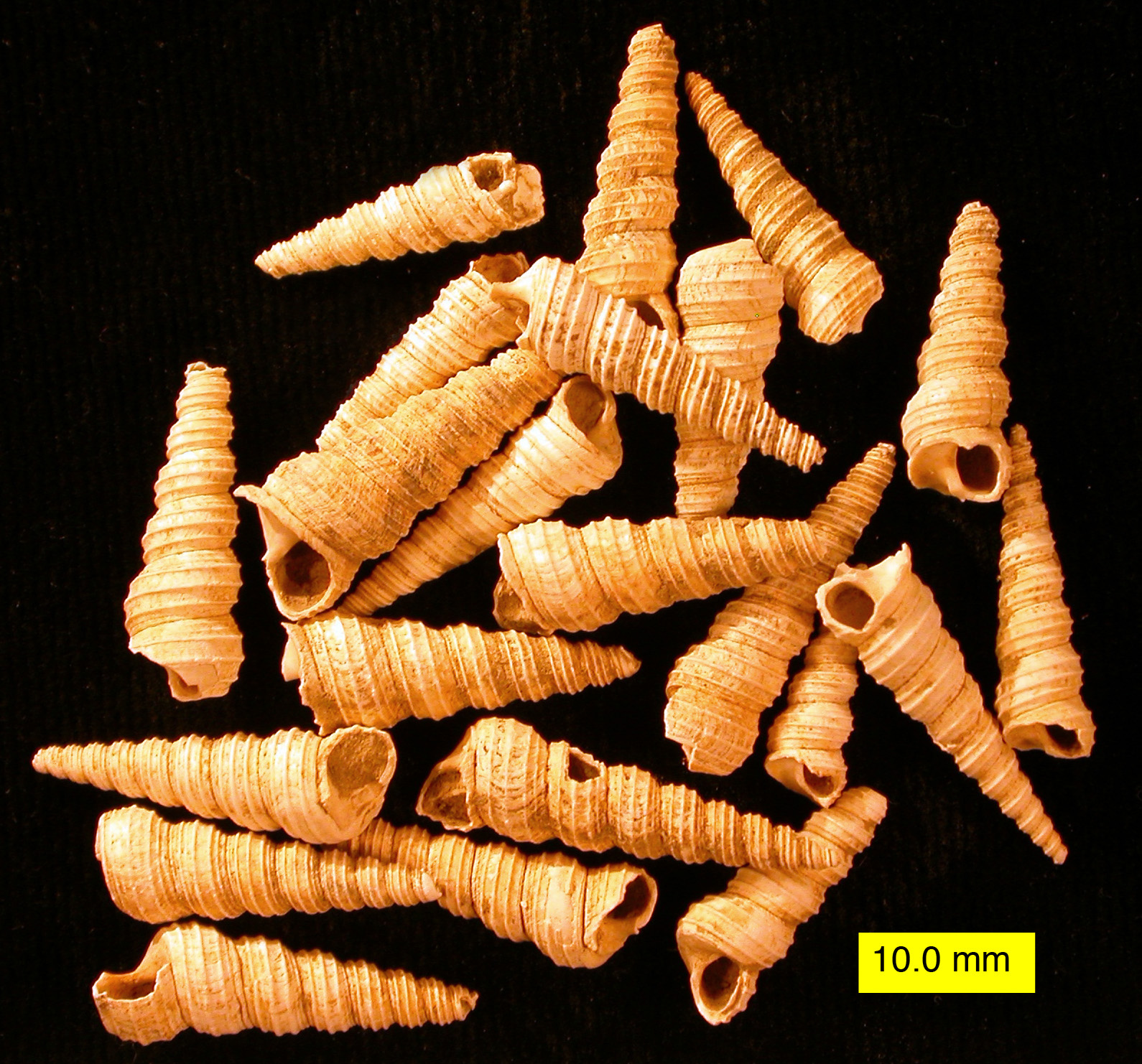
- Fossil shells of Turritella cingulifera from the Pliocene of Cyprus

Scientific classification
- Kingdom: Animalia
- Phylum: Mollusca
- Class: Gastropoda
- Subclass: Caenogastropoda
- Order: incertae sedis
- Superfamily: Cerithioidea
- Family: Turritellidae
- Genus: Turritella; Lamarck, 1799

Synonyms
- Colpospirella Powell, 1951; Haustator (Kurosioia) Ida, 1952; Proto Blainville, 1824 (Invalid: junior homonym of Proto Leach, 1814 [Crustacea]); Torcula Gray, 1847; Turritella (Eglisia) Gray, 1847; Turritella (Haustator) Montfort, 1810; Turritella (Mesalia) Gray, 1847; † Turritella (Tomyris) Michailovskij, 1912 †· accepted, alternate representation; Turritella (Torcula) Gray, 1847; Turritella (Zaria) Gray, 1847; Zaria Gray, 1847

= Turritella =

Turritella Temporal range: Late Jurassic–recent

Genus of gastropods

Turritella is a genus of medium-sized sea snails with an operculum, marine gastropod mollusks in the family Turritellidae.

They have tightly coiled shells, whose overall shape is basically that of an elongated cone.

The name Turritella comes from the Latin word turritus 'turreted, towered' and the diminutive suffix -ella.

== Species ==
=== Valid ===
Valid species within the genus Turritella are listed below. Fossil species are marked with a dagger "†".

- Turritella acropora (Dall, 1889)
- Turritella albolapis Finlay, 1924
- Turritella algida Melvill & Standen, 1912
- Turritella anactor Berry, 1957
- Turritella annulata Kiener, 1843
- † Turritella apicalis - Pleistocene of Florida
- Turritella attenuata Reeve, 1849
- Turritella aurocincta Martens, 1875
- Turritella bacillum Kiener, 1843
- † Turritella badensis - Cenozoic of Denmark, Germany and Poland
- Turritella banksii Gray in Reeve, 1849
- Turritella bayeri Petuch, 2001
- Turritella bicingulata Lamarck, 1822
- Turritella broderipiana d'Orbigny, 1840
- Turritella caelata Mörch in Dunker, 1858
- Turritella capensis (Krauss, 1848)
- Turritella carinifera Lamarck, 1822
- Turritella chordata Suter, 1908
- Turritella chrysotoxa Tomlin, 1825
- Turritella cingulata Sowerby, 1825
- Turritella cingulifera G.B. Sowerby I, 1825
- Turritella clarionensis Hertlein & Strong, 1951
- Turritella cochlea Reeve, 1849
- Turritella columnaris Kiener, 1843
- Turritella communis Risso, 1826
- Turritella concava Martens, 1880
- Turritella congelata Adams & Reeve, 1850
- Turritella conofasciata (Sacco 1895)
- Turritella conspersa Adams & Reeve, 1850
- Turritella cooperi Carpenter, 1864
- Turritella cornea Lamarck, 1822
- Turritella couteaudi Rochebrune & Mabille, 1889
- † Turritella crenulata Nyst, 1844
- Turritella crocea Kiener, 1843
- † Turritella cruzadoi DeVries, 2007
- Turritella decipiens Monterosato, 1878
- Turritella declivis Adams & Reeve, 1850
- Turritella dirkhartogensis (Garrard, 1972)
- Turritella duplicata (Linnaeus, 1758)
- Turritella dura Mörch, 1860
- Turritella elachista Rochebrune & Mabille, 1889
- Turritella exoleta (Linnaeus, 1758)
- Turritella fastigiata Adams & Reeve, 1850
- Turritella ferruginea Reeve, 1849
- Turritella fultoni Melvill & Standen, 1901
- Turritella fuscomaculata Bozzetti, 2009
- Turritella gemmata Reeve, 1849
- Turritella gonostoma Valenciennes, 1832
- Turritella hastula Reeve, 1849
- Turritella hookeri Reeve, 1849
- Turritella incisa Reeve, 1849
- † Turritella incrassata - Pliocene of Belgium
- Turritella knysnaensis Krauss, 1848
- Turritella leeuwinensis (Garrard, 1972)
- Turritella lentiginosa Reeve, 1849
- Turritella leucostoma Valenciennes, 1832
- Turritella ligar Deshayes, 1843
- Turritella lindae (Petuch, 1987)
- Turritella lyonsi Garcia, 2006
- Turritella maculata Reeve, 1849
- Turritella marianopsis Petuch, 1990
- Turritella minuta Turton, 1932
- Turritella monilis Adams & Reeve, 1850
- Turritella monterosatoi Kobelt, 1887
- Turritella nebulosa Kiener, 1843
- Turritella nodulosa King & Broderip, 1832
- Turritella praetermissa (Dautzenberg, 1912)
- Turritella punctata Kiener, 1843
- Turritella radula Kiener, 1843
- Turritella reevei Dautzenberg & Fischer, 1906
- † Turritella riverae DeVries, 2007
- Turritella rubescens Reeve, 1849
- † Turritella salasi DeVries, 2007
- Turritella sanguinea Reeve, 1849
- Turritella sedanensis (Martin 1905)
- † Turritella steiningeri Harzhauser, 2007
- Turritella terebra (Linnaeus, 1758)
- † Turritella terebralis Lamarck, 1799
- Turritella torulosa Kiener, 1843
- † Turritella trempina - Pliocene
- Turritella triplicata Philippi, 1836
- Turritella turbona Monterosato, 1877
- † Turritella turris - Early Miocene of Central Europe
- Turritella ungulina (Linnaeus, 1758)
- Turritella variegata (Linnaeus, 1758)
- Turritella vermicularis (Brocchi, 1814)
- † Turritella vertebroides Morton, 1834 - Late Cretaceous of South of North America
- Turritella wareni Ryall & Vos, 2010
- Turritella willetti McLean, 1970
- Turritella yucatecana (Dall, 1881)

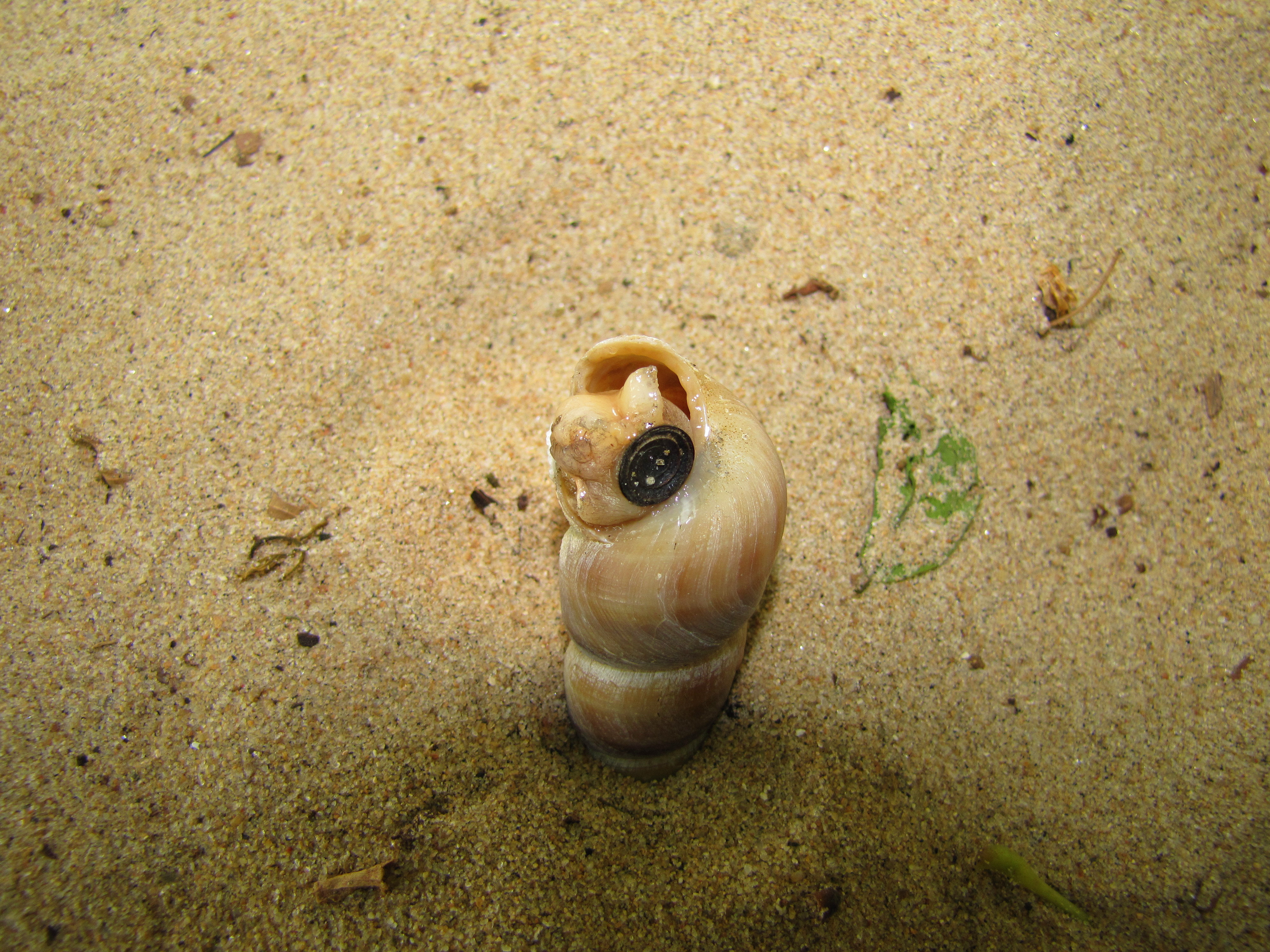
A medium sized sea snail in a genus India

=== Invalid ===
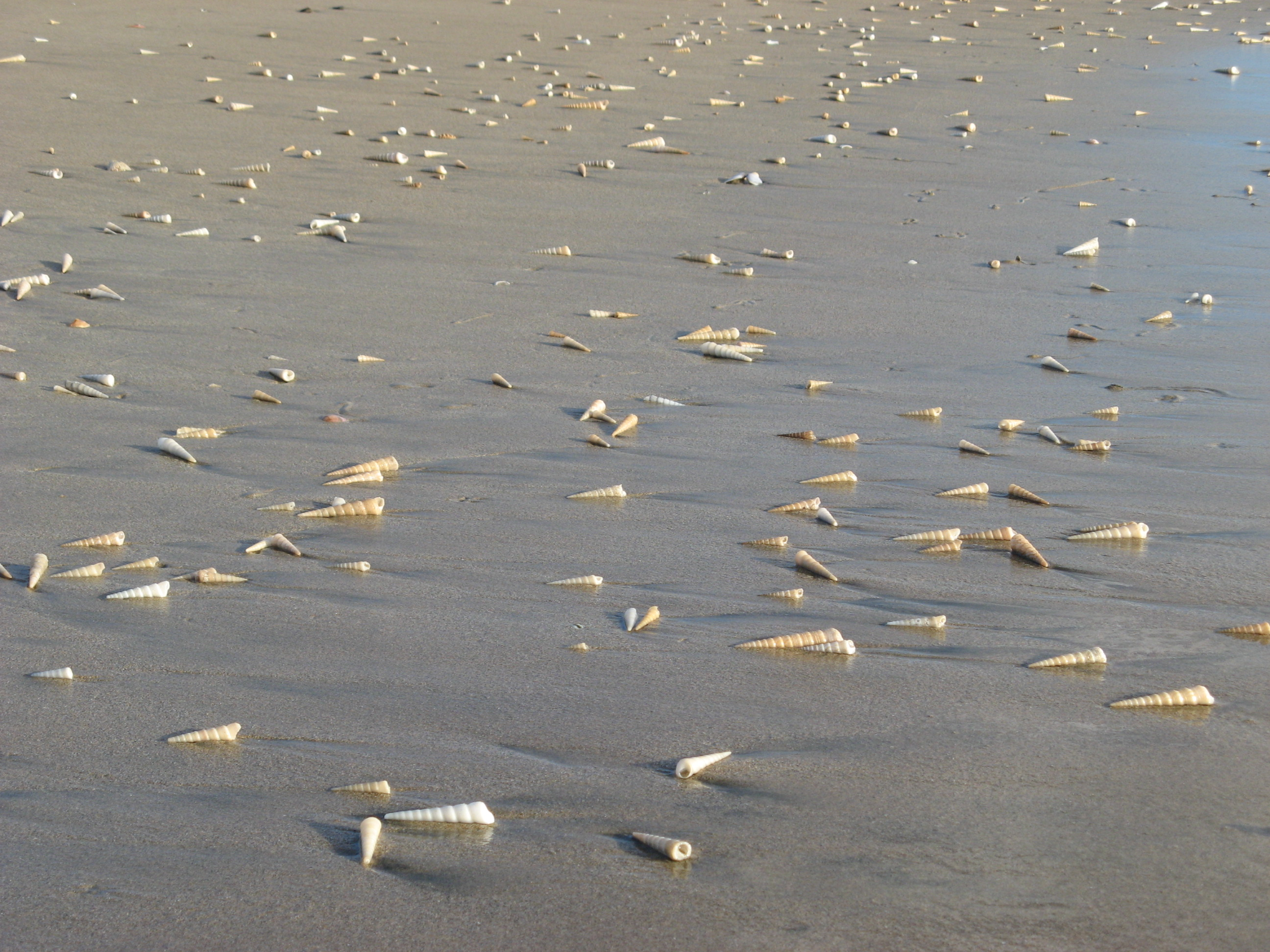
Numerous shells of a Turritella species washed up on the beach at Playa Grande, Costa Rica

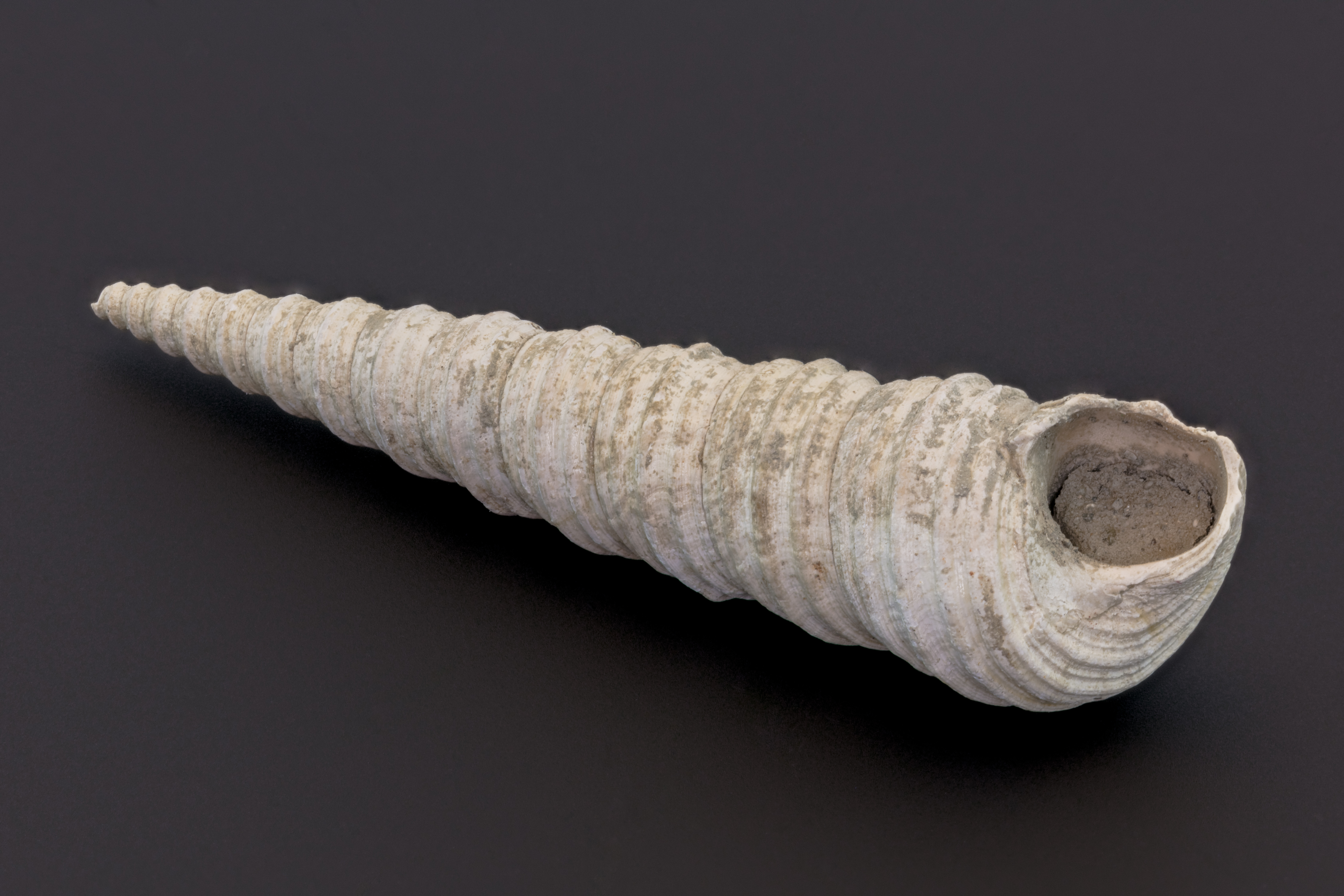
Detail of a fossilized Turritella tricarinata

These are species assigned to Turritella that were brought into synonymy with other taxa:

- Turritella (Torcula) Gray, 1847: synonym of Turritella Lamarck, 1799
- Turritella (Torcula) cochlea Reeve, 1849: synonym of Turritella cochlea Reeve, 1849
- Turritella acicula Stimpson, 1851: synonym of Turritellopsis stimpsoni (Dall, 1919)
- Turritella alternata Say, 1822: synonym of Bittiolum alternatum (Say, 1822)
- † Turritella andenensis Otuka, 1934: synonym of Neohaustator andenensis (Otuka, 1934)
- Turritella aquila Reeve, 1849: synonym of Turritella conspersa Adams & Reeve, 1850
- Turritella areolata Stimpson, 1851: synonym of Tachyrhynchus reticulatus (Mighels & Adams, 1842)
- Turritella auricincta Martens, 1875: synonym of Turritella aurocincta Martens, 1875
- Turritella bicolor Adams & Reeve, 1850: synonym of Turritella cingulifera G.B. Sowerby I, 1825
- Turritella brevialis Lamarck, 1822: synonym of Mesalia brevialis (Lamarck, 1822)
- Turritella canaliculata Adams & Reeve, 1850: synonym of Turritella cingulifera G.B. Sowerby I, 1825
- Turritella candida Reeve, 1849: synonym of Turritella gemmata Reeve, 1849
- Turritella cingulata Sowerby, 1825 is a synonym of Incatella cingulata (Sowerby, 1825)
- Turritella concava Say, 1826: synonym of Terebra concava (Say, 1826)
- Turritella costulata Mighels & Adams, 1842: synonym of Acirsa borealis (Lyell, 1841)
- Turritella costulata Møller, 1842: synonym of Eumetula arctica (Mørch, 1857)
- Turritella crenulata (Donald, 1900): synonym of Colpospira joannae (Hedley, 1923)
- Turritella erosa Couthouy, 1838: synonym of Tachyrhynchus erosus (Couthouy, 1838)
- Turritella eschrichti Hölböll in Möller, 1842: synonym of Acirsa borealis (Lyell, 1841)
- Turritella excavata G. B. Sowerby III, 1870: synonym of Turritella declivis Adams & Reeve in Reeve, 1849
- Turritella flammulata Kiener, 1843-44: synonym ofTurritella ligar Deshayes, 1843
- Turritella fortilirata G. B. Sowerby III, 1914: synonym of Neohaustator fortilirata (G. B. Sowerby III, 1914)
- Turritella gracillima Gould, 1860: synonym of Turritella cingulifera G. B. Sowerby I, 1825
- Turritella granosa Quoy & Gaimard, 1834: synonym of Opalia granosa (Quoy & Gaimard, 1834)
- Turritella imbricata (Linnaeus, 1758): synonym of Turritella variegata (Linnaeus, 1758)
- Turritella knysnaensis Krauss, 1848: synonym of Turritella capensis (Krauss, 1848)
- Turritella lactea Möller, 1842: synonym of Mesalia lactea (Möller, 1842)
- † Turritella maiquetiana Weisbord, 1962: synonym of Turritella paraguanensis Hodson, 1926
- Turritella mediolevis Verco, 1910: synonym of Colpospira mediolevis (Verco, 1910)
- Turritella meta Reeve, 1849: synonym of Turritella gemmata
- Turritella monterosatoi Kobelt, 1887: synonym of Turritella turbona Monterosato, 1877
- Turritella nzimaorum Ryall & Vos, 2010: synonym of Turritella caelata Mörch in Dunker, 1858
- Turritella opalina Adams & Reeve, 1850: synonym of Mesalia opalina (Adams & Reeve, 1850)
- Turritella opulenta Hedley, 1907: synonym of Glyptozaria opulenta (Hedley, 1907)
- Turritella paraguanensis Hodson, 1926: synonym of Turritella variegata (Linnaeus, 1758)
- Turritella philippi Aradas, 1842: synonym of Acirsa subdecussata (Cantraine, 1835)
- Turritella polaris Möller, 1842: synonym of Tachyrhynchus erosus (Couthouy, 1838)
- Turritella spina Crosse & Fischer, 1864: synonym of Cingulina spina (Crosse & Fischer, 1864)
- Turritella reticulata Mighels & Adams, 1842: synonym of Tachyrhynchus reticulatus (Mighels & Adams, 1842)
- Turritella spirata Sowerby I, 1825: synonym of Eglisia spirata (Sowerby I, 1825)
- Turritella symmetrica Hutton, 1873: synonym of Stiracolpus symmetricus (Hutton, 1873)
- Turritella trisulcata Lamarck, 1822: synonym of Turritella vermicularis
- Turritella yucatecanum Dall, 1881: synonym of Turritella yucatecana (Dall, 1881)

== Fossil species ==
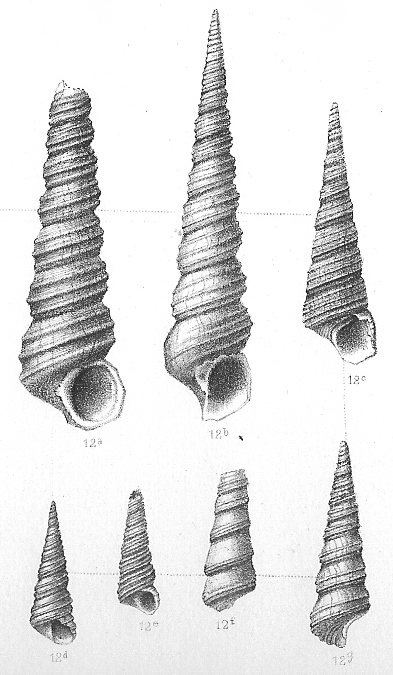
Fossil specimens of Turritella incrassata

The genus is known from the Cretaceous to the Recent periods.

The shells are quite frequently found as fossils, and the carbonate stone made from large quantities of Turritella shells is often referred to as "Turritella limestone", or, if silicified, "Turritella agate". Both varieties of this stone are commonly sold as polished cabochons.

=== "Turritella agate" ===
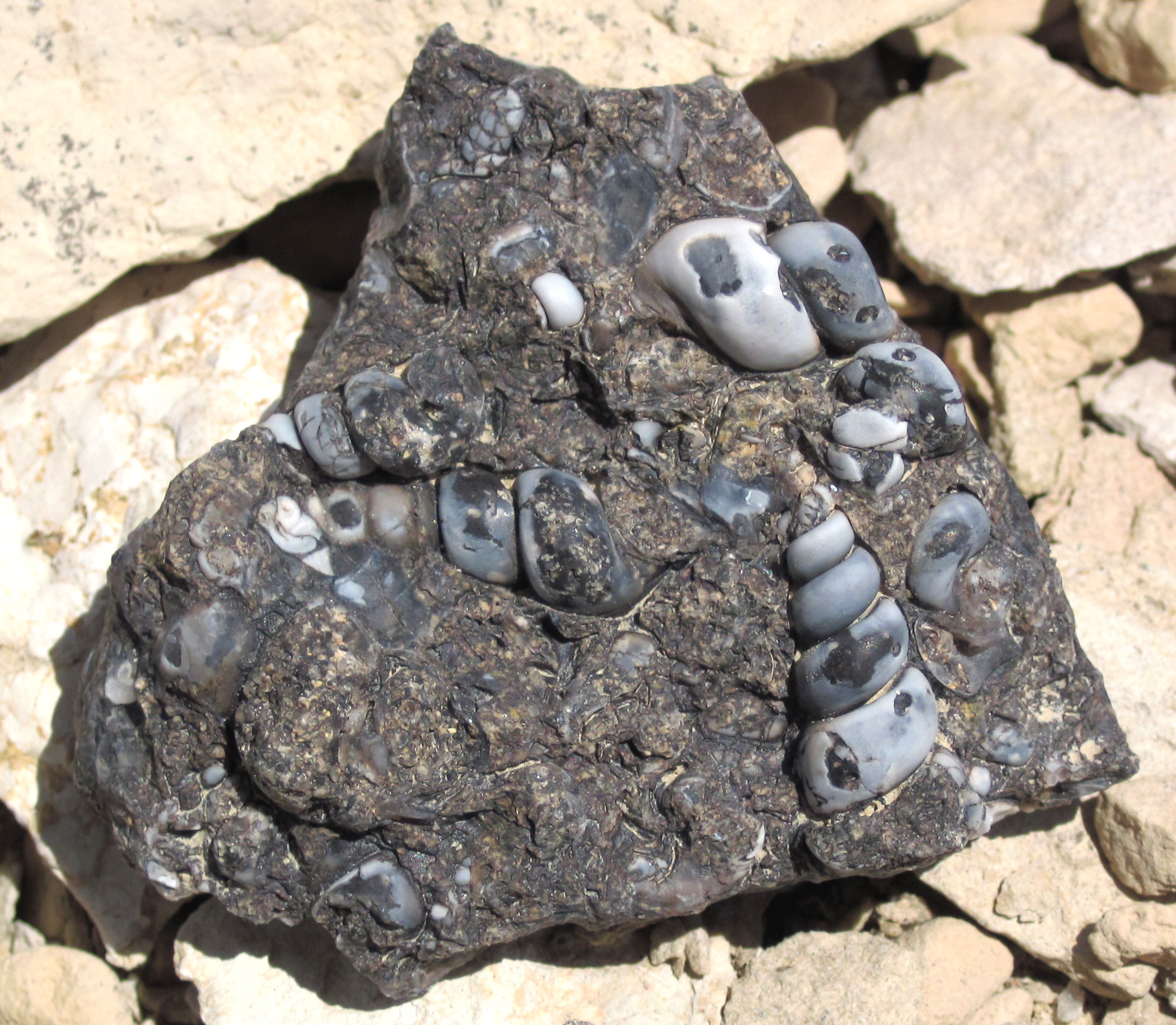
Turritella agate, in which the fossils are a different genus

One variety of "Turritella agate", that from the Green River Formation in Wyoming, is a fossiliferous rock which does indeed contain numerous high-spired snail shells. However, contrary to the common name, these snails are not in the marine genus Turritella, instead they are freshwater snails in the species Elimia tenera, family Pleuroceridae from the Eocene epoch. The rock in which these snail shells are so abundant varies from a soft sandstone to a dense chalcedony. This dense silicified rock is popular with gem and mineral hobbyists, as well as with New Age practitioners.

=== Turritellenplatte ===
The Erminger Turritellenplatte ("Turritella plate of Ermingen") near Ulm, Germany is a rocky outcrop situated in the northern part of the North Alpine Foreland Basin. It is famous for its superabundance of Turritella turris shells within its sediments and dates from the Burdigalian.
