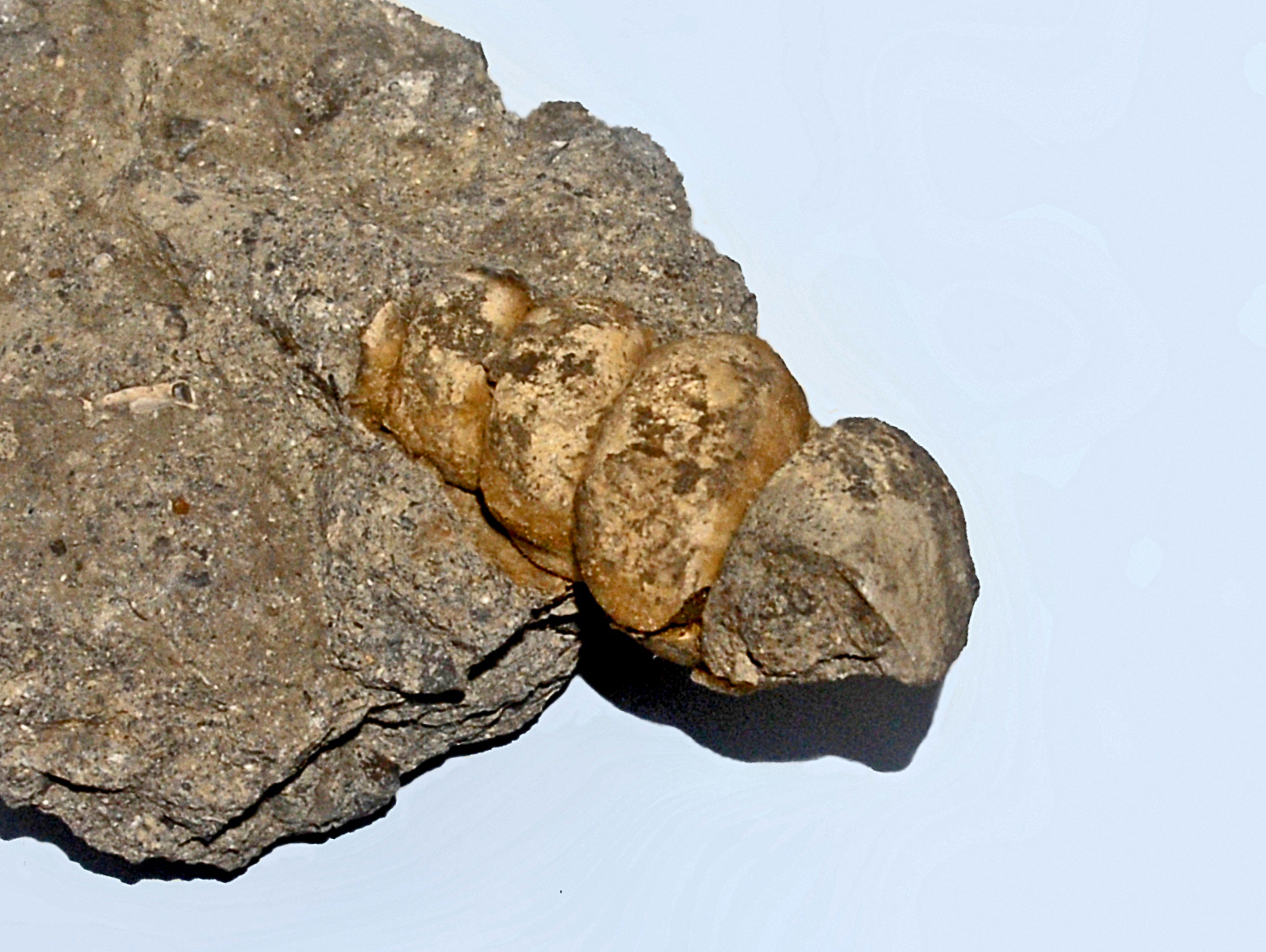
- Fossil of Protoma cathedralis

Scientific classification
- Kingdom: Animalia
- Phylum: Mollusca
- Class: Gastropoda
- Subclass: Caenogastropoda
- Order: incertae sedis
- Family: Turritellidae
- Genus: Protoma; Baird, 1870

Synonyms
- Protoma (Protomella); Protomella Thiele, 1929

= Protoma =

Protoma Temporal range: Oligocene - Recent

Genus of molluscs

Protoma is a genus of sea snails, marine gastropod mollusks in the family Turritellidae.

== Species ==
Extant species within the genus Protoma include:

- Protoma knockeri Baird, 1870
- Protoma praetermissa (Dautzenberg, 1912): synonym of Turritella praetermissa (Dautzenberg, 1912)

Species brought into synonymy

- Protoma capensis (Krauss, 1848): synonym of Turritella capensis (Krauss, 1848)

== Extinct species ==
- † Protoma cathedralis Brongniart 1856
- † Protoma deshayesi d'Archiac 1850
- † Protoma renevieri d'Archiac and Haime 1854
- † Protoma retrodilatatum Vredenburg 1928
- † Protoma rotifera Deshayes 1832
- † Protoma sindiense Vredenburg 1928
- † Protoma subrenevieri Vredenburg 1928

Fossils of sea snails within this genus have been found in sediments of Europe, South Africa, India, and Pakistan from Oligocene to Quaternary (age range: 28.4 to 0.012 million years ago).
