= T. crocea =

T. crocea may refer to:

- Terina crocea, a geometer moth
- Thismia crocea, a myco-heterotrophic plant
- Tridacna crocea, a giant clam
- Tridrepana crocea, a hook tip moth
- Triteleia crocea, a flowering plant
- Turritella crocea, a sea snail
