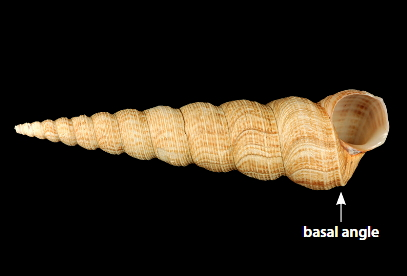
- Shell of Turritella ferruginea

Scientific classification
- Kingdom: Animalia
- Phylum: Mollusca
- Class: Gastropoda
- Subclass: Caenogastropoda
- Order: incertae sedis
- Family: Turritellidae
- Genus: Turritella
- Species: T. ferruginea

Binomial name
- Turritella ferruginea Reeve, 1849

Synonyms
- Turritella (Zaria) ferruginea Reeve, 1849 ·

= Turritella ferruginea =

Species of gastropod

Turritella ferruginea is a species of sea snail, a marine gastropod mollusk in the family Turritellidae.

== Status ==
Examination of the spiral sculpture has revealed a cancellated sculpture (also see Reeve, 1849, pl. 7, sp. 32 "with minute longitudinal striae"). All three specimens show a backwards folded lip at the columellar side. These two features could possibly indicate this species is not a turritellid, and could lead to a potential relationship with species of Eglisia. Further examinations as to the before mentioned relationship and a possible status for this species are currently ongoing. Similar sculpture has been observed in the type samples of Turritella fultoni Melvill, 1897 and Turritella illustris Melvill, 1904

== Description ==
The length of the shell reaches up to 110 mm.

The shell is relatively large, many-whorled, and long and slender, tapering gradually toward the apex. The whorls are slightly convex, with a rounded outward shape, and are sculpted with numerous closely spaced, crisp spiral threads. The surface is dull, and the basal angle is well-defined, marked by a stronger spiral cord (indicated in the figure). The aperture is rounded, and the outer lip is distinctly concave, appearing hollowed inward.

The color ranges from cream to buff, often speckled with reddish-brown, which may appear in the form of curved axial flame-like markings.

== Distribution ==
This species is endemic to South Africa and occurs off the Agulhas Bank (False Bay to Algoa Bay) at depths between 40 m and 210 m.
