= Turritella algida =

Scientific classification
- Kingdom: Animalia
- Phylum: Mollusca
- Class: Gastropoda
- Subclass: Caenogastropoda
- Order: incertae sedis
- Family: Turritellidae
- Genus: Turritella
- Species: T. algida

Binomial name
- Turritella algida Melvill & Standen, 1912

Species of gastropod

Turritella algida, accepted name Colpospirella algida, is a species of sea snail, a marine gastropod mollusk in the family Turritellidae.

== Description ==
C. algida has a small shell with a total height of about 4–6 mm and a width of approximately 2 mm. The shell has a spiral structure of a prominent keel that bisects the whorls. Specimen photos show the teleoconch having 5–7 total whorls. The color of the shell is white and has a rough exterior with lightly impressed axial growth lines. The aperture is ovulate-rounded and lacks a siphonal canal.

== Distribution and habitat ==
C. algida is found off the coasts of the Falkland Islands, Antarctic Chile including the Magallanes region, and Tierra del Fuego, Argentina. C. algida is a marine benthic species that is found in waters between 60 and 600 meters below the surface.

== Life habits ==
=== Diet ===
Turritellidae species are suspension feeders that primarily consume plankton, detritus, and other organic matter that is suspended in the waters that the gastropods inhabit.

=== Reproduction ===
Species in Turritellidae reproduce sexually and are likely gonochoric.

=== Locomotion ===
C. algida moves by mucus mediated gliding.
