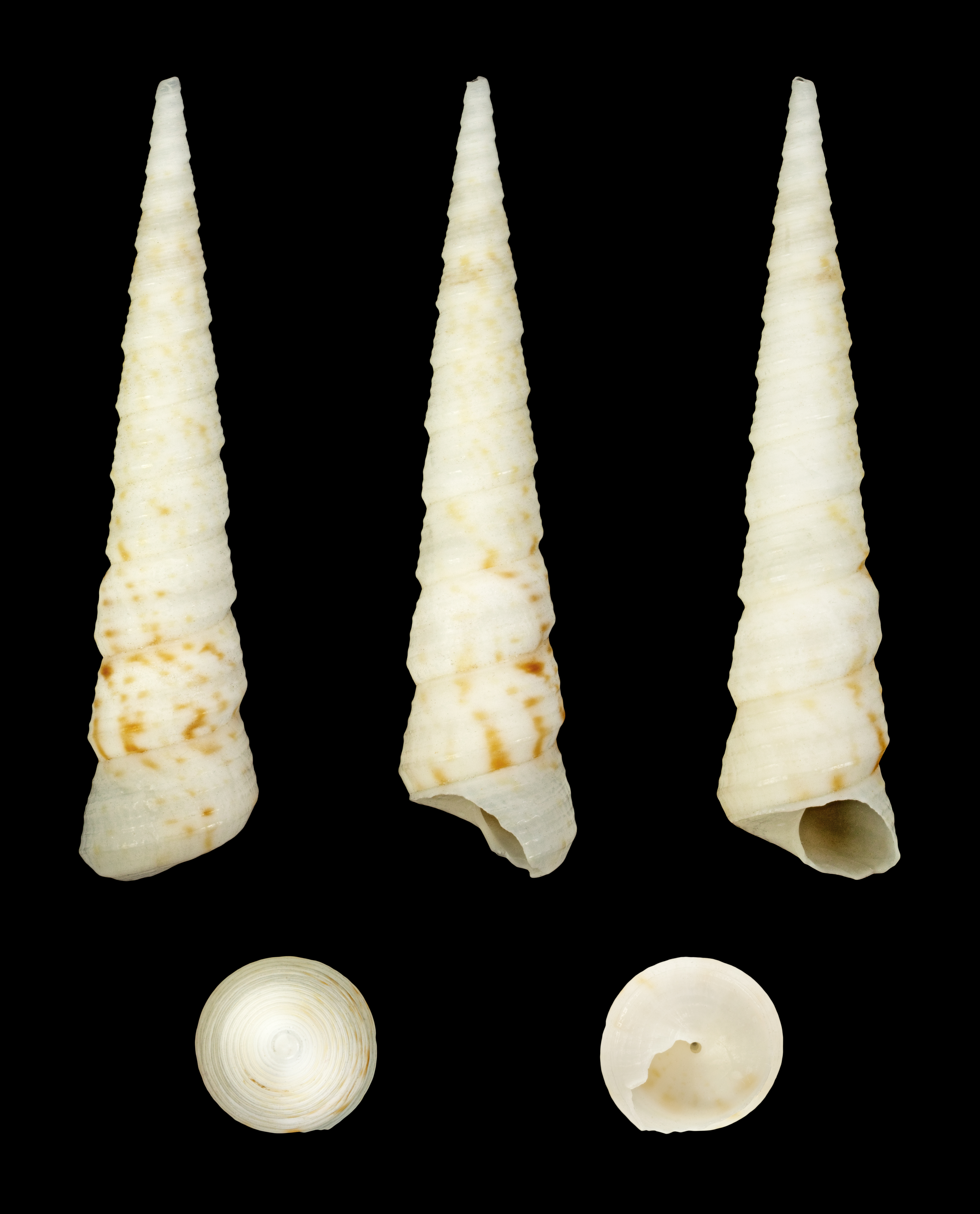

Scientific classification
- Kingdom: Animalia
- Phylum: Mollusca
- Class: Gastropoda
- Subclass: Caenogastropoda
- Order: incertae sedis
- Family: Turritellidae
- Genus: Turritella
- Species: T. leucostoma

Binomial name
- Turritella leucostoma Valenciennes, 1832

Synonyms
- Turritella cumingii Reeve, 1849; Turritella dura Mörch, 1860; Turritella tigrina Kiener, 1843

= Turritella leucostoma =

Species of gastropod

Turritella leucostoma is a species of sea snail, a marine gastropod mollusk in the family Turritellidae.
