= Turritella wareni =

Scientific classification
- Kingdom: Animalia
- Phylum: Mollusca
- Class: Gastropoda
- Subclass: Caenogastropoda
- Order: incertae sedis
- Family: Turritellidae
- Genus: Turritella
- Species: T. wareni

Binomial name
- Turritella wareni Ryall & Vos, 2010

Species of gastropod

Turritella wareni is a species of sea snail, a marine gastropod mollusk in the family Turritellidae.
