= Turritella martensi =

Scientific classification
- Kingdom: Animalia
- Phylum: Mollusca
- Class: Gastropoda
- Subclass: Caenogastropoda
- Order: incertae sedis
- Family: Turritellidae
- Genus: Turritella
- Species: T. martensi

Binomial name
- Turritella martensi Selli, 1974

Synonyms
- List: Colpospira (Acutospira) concava E. von Martens, 1880; Haustator (Kurosioia) gilletti Garrard, 1974; Turritella (Torcula) martensi Selli, 1974; Turritella concava E. von Martens, 1880; Turritella gilletti (Garrard, 1974)

Species of gastropod

Turritella martensi is a species of sea snail, a marine gastropod mollusk in the family Turritellidae.
