= Turritella hookeri =

Scientific classification
- Kingdom: Animalia
- Phylum: Mollusca
- Class: Gastropoda
- Subclass: Caenogastropoda
- Order: incertae sedis
- Family: Turritellidae
- Genus: Turritella
- Species: T. hookeri

Binomial name
- Turritella hookeri Reeve, 1849

Species of gastropod

Turritella hookeri is a species of sea snail, a marine gastropod mollusk in the family Turritellidae.

== Description ==
The maximum recorded shell length is 36 mm.

== Habitat ==
Minimum recorded depth is 9 m. Maximum recorded depth is 156 m.
