= Turritella bayeri =

Scientific classification
- Kingdom: Animalia
- Phylum: Mollusca
- Class: Gastropoda
- Subclass: Caenogastropoda
- Order: incertae sedis
- Family: Turritellidae
- Genus: Turritella
- Species: T. bayeri

Binomial name
- Turritella bayeri Petuch, 2001

Synonyms
- Torcula bayeri Petuch, 2001

Species of gastropod

Turritella bayeri is a species of sea snail, a marine gastropod mollusk in the family Turritellidae.

== Description ==
The maximum recorded shell length is 44 mm.

== Habitat ==
Minimum recorded depth is 2 m. Maximum recorded depth is 2 m.
