= Turritella yucatecana =

Scientific classification
- Kingdom: Animalia
- Phylum: Mollusca
- Class: Gastropoda
- Subclass: Caenogastropoda
- Order: incertae sedis
- Family: Turritellidae
- Genus: Turritella
- Species: T. yucatecana

Binomial name
- Turritella yucatecana (W. H. Dall, 1881)

Synonyms
- Turritella yucatecanum Dall, 1881

Species of sea snail

Turritella yucatecana is a species of sea snail, a marine gastropod mollusk in the family Turritellidae.

== Description ==
The maximum recorded shell length is 16.5 mm.

== Habitat ==
Minimum recorded depth is 1170 m. Maximum recorded depth is 1170 m.
