= Turritella aurocincta =

Scientific classification
- Kingdom: Animalia
- Phylum: Mollusca
- Class: Gastropoda
- Subclass: Caenogastropoda
- Order: incertae sedis
- Family: Turritellidae
- Genus: Turritella
- Species: T. aurocincta

Binomial name
- Turritella aurocincta Martens, 1875

Species of gastropod

Turritella aurocincta is a species of sea snail, a marine gastropod mollusk in the family Turritellidae. It is located in the Red Sea and around Madagascar.
