= Glyptozaria =

Scientific classification
- Kingdom: Animalia
- Phylum: Mollusca
- Class: Gastropoda
- Subclass: Caenogastropoda
- Order: incertae sedis
- Family: Cerithiidae
- Genus: Glyptozaria; Iredale, 1924

Genus of gastropods

Glyptozaria is a genus of sea snails, marine gastropod mollusks in the family Cerithiidae.

== Species ==
The following species are recognized in the genus Glyptozaria:

- Glyptozaria columnaria Cotton & Woods, 1935
- Glyptozaria opulenta (Hedley, 1907)
- †Glyptozaria transenna (Tenison Woods, 1879)
