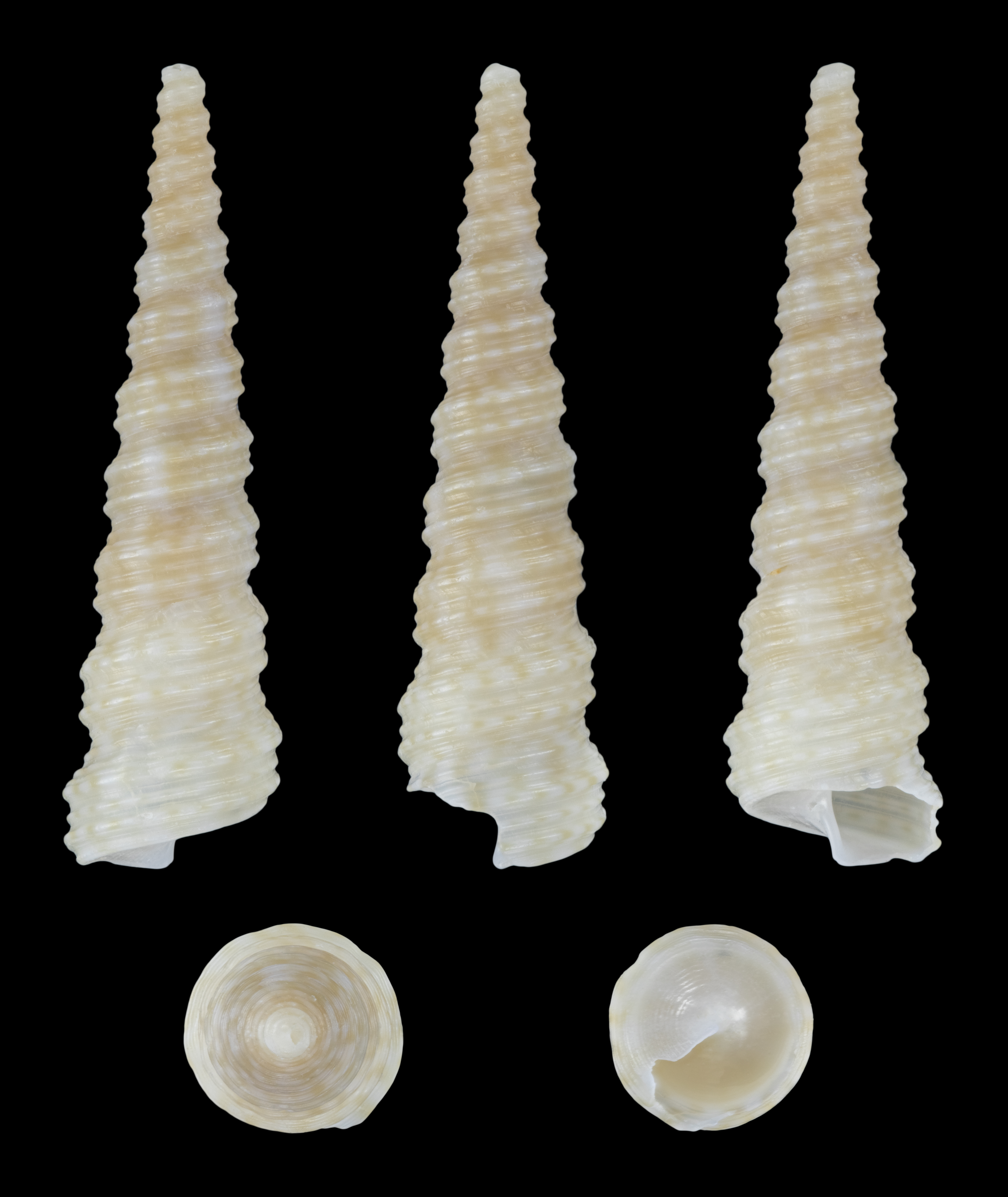

Scientific classification
- Kingdom: Animalia
- Phylum: Mollusca
- Class: Gastropoda
- Subclass: Caenogastropoda
- Order: incertae sedis
- Family: Turritellidae
- Genus: Turritella
- Species: T. columnaris

Binomial name
- Turritella columnaris Kiener, 1843

= Turritella columnaris =

Species of gastropod

Turritella columnaris is a species of sea snail, a marine gastropod mollusk in the family Turritellidae.
