= Protoma knockeri =

Scientific classification
- Kingdom: Animalia
- Phylum: Mollusca
- Class: Gastropoda
- Subclass: Caenogastropoda
- Order: incertae sedis
- Family: Turritellidae
- Genus: Protoma
- Species: P. knockeri

Binomial name
- Protoma knockeri Baird, 1870

Species of gastropod

Protoma knockeri is a species of sea snail, a marine gastropod mollusk in the family Turritellidae.
