= Turritella ligar =

Scientific classification
- Kingdom: Animalia
- Phylum: Mollusca
- Class: Gastropoda
- Subclass: Caenogastropoda
- Order: incertae sedis
- Family: Turritellidae
- Genus: Turritella
- Species: T. ligar

Binomial name
- Turritella ligar Deshayes, 1843

Synonyms
- Turritella flammulata Kiener, 1843–44

Species of gastropod

Turritella ligar Deshayes, 1843

Turritella ligar, common name : the Ligar screw shell, is a species of sea snail, a marine gastropod mollusk in the family Turritellidae.

== Description ==
The shell grows to a length of 90 mm.

== Distribution ==
This species is distributed in the Atlantic Ocean along Senegal, Guinea and Gabon.
