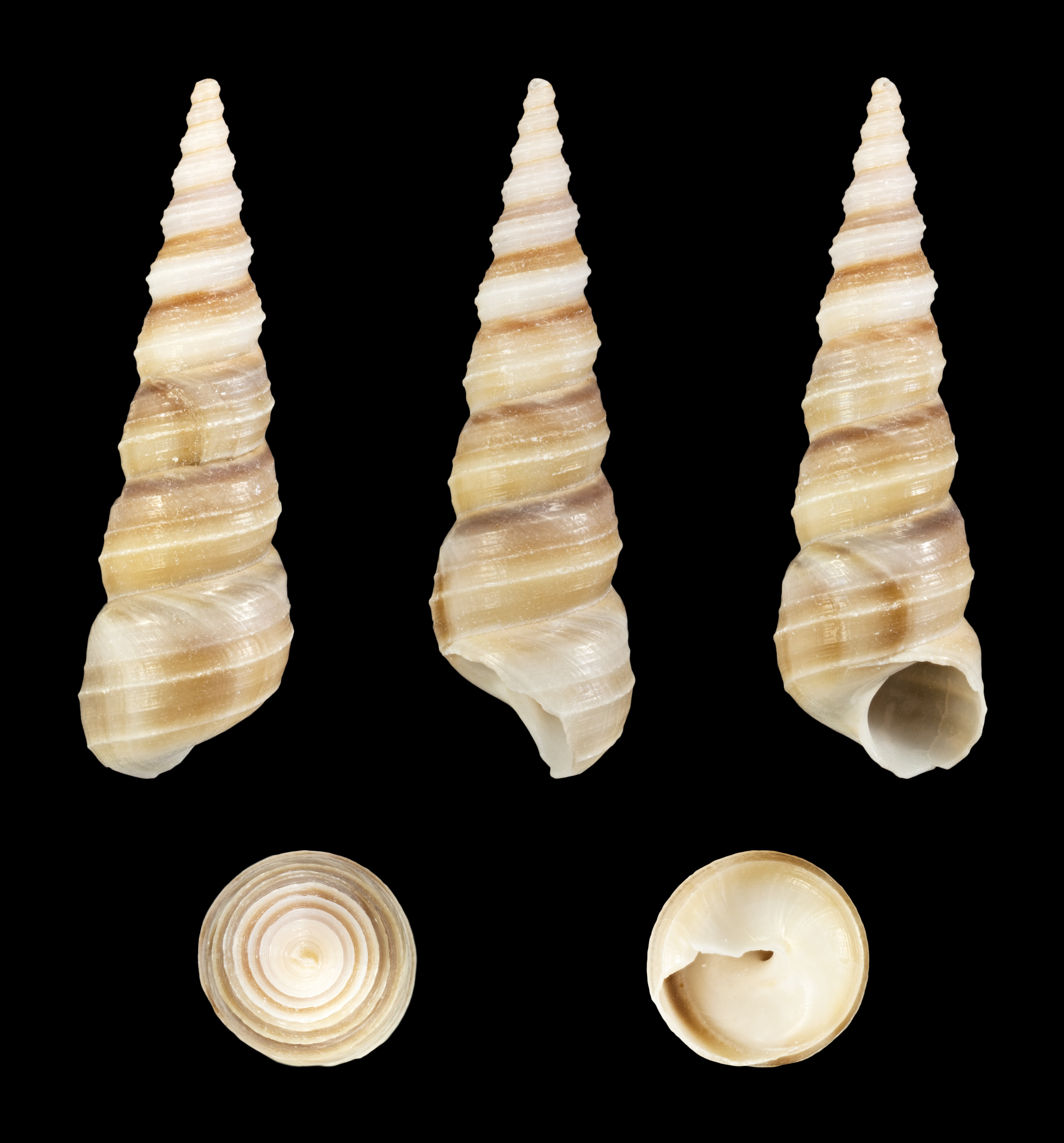

Scientific classification
- Kingdom: Animalia
- Phylum: Mollusca
- Class: Gastropoda
- Subclass: Caenogastropoda
- Order: incertae sedis
- Family: Turritellidae
- Genus: Turritella
- Species: T. attenuata

Binomial name
- Turritella attenuata Reeve, 1849

= Turritella attenuata =

Species of gastropod

Turritella attenuata is a species of sea snail, a marine gastropod mollusk in the family Turritellidae.

== Distribution ==
Turritella attenuata is found in sandy and muddy substrates of Indian Ocean of India and Srilanka.
