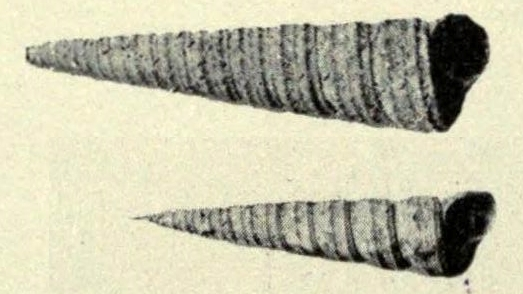

Scientific classification
- Kingdom: Animalia
- Phylum: Mollusca
- Class: Gastropoda
- Subclass: Caenogastropoda
- Order: incertae sedis
- Family: Turritellidae
- Genus: Turritella
- Species: T. apicalis

Binomial name
- Turritella apicalis Heilprin, 1886

= Turritella apicalis =

Turritella apicalis Temporal range: Pleistocene

Extinct species of gastropod

Turritella apicalis is an extinct species of fossil sea snail, a marine gastropod mollusc in the family Turritellidae. These fossils are found in Florida.
