= Turritella nodulosa =

Scientific classification
- Kingdom: Animalia
- Phylum: Mollusca
- Class: Gastropoda
- Subclass: Caenogastropoda
- Order: incertae sedis
- Family: Turritellidae
- Genus: Turritella
- Species: T. nodulosa

Binomial name
- Turritella nodulosa King & Broderip, 1832

Species of gastropod

Turritella nodulosa is a species of sea snail, a marine gastropod mollusk in the family Turritellidae.

== Description ==
Shell size 40 mm.

== Distribution ==
T. nodulosa can be found in Magdalena Bay off Baja California as well as throughout the southern Gulf of California.
