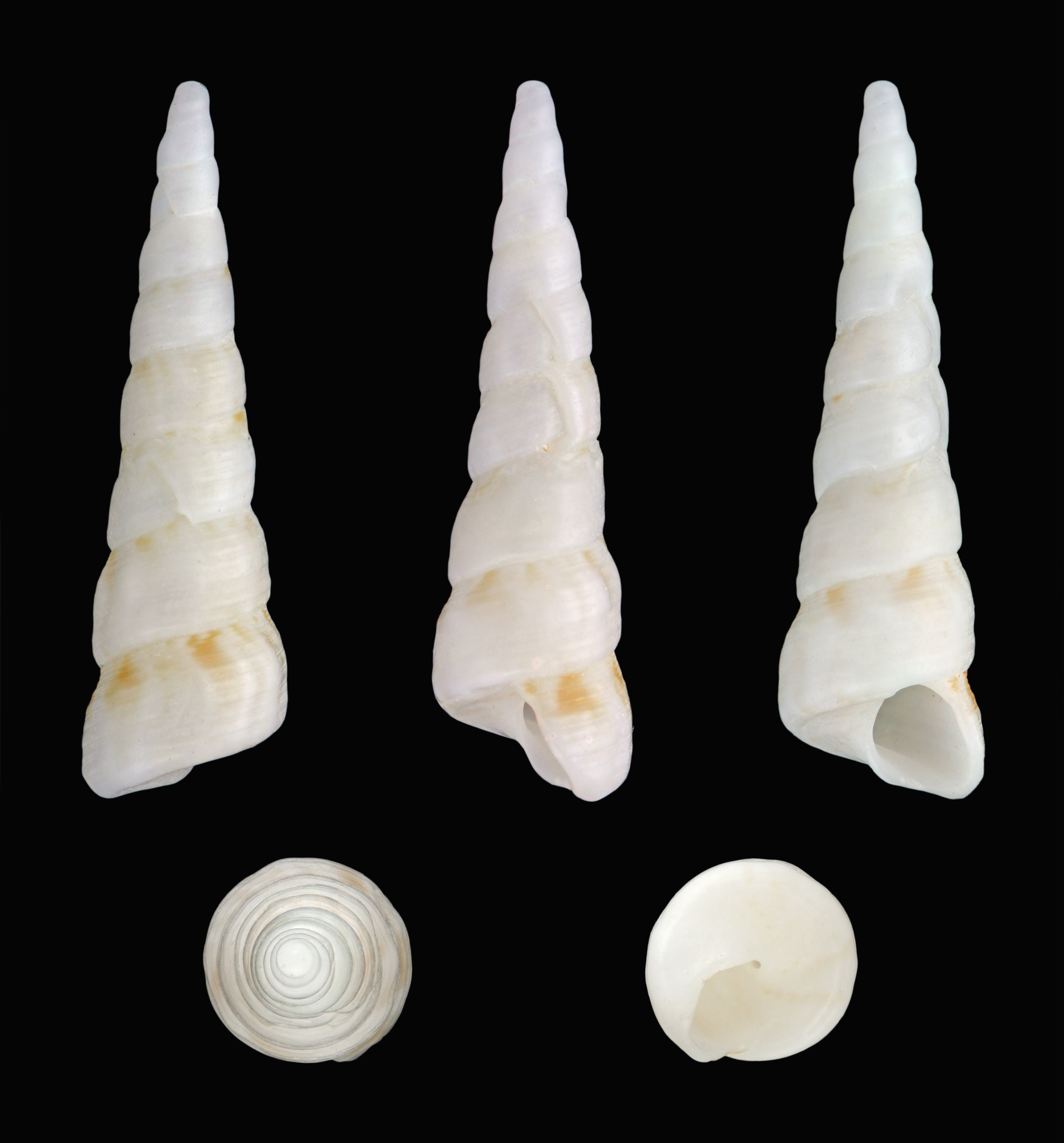

Scientific classification
- Kingdom: Animalia
- Phylum: Mollusca
- Class: Gastropoda
- Subclass: Caenogastropoda
- Order: incertae sedis
- Family: Turritellidae
- Genus: Turritella
- Species: T. acropora

Binomial name
- Turritella acropora (Dall, 1889)

Synonyms
- Turritella (Torcula) acropora Dall, 1889

= Turritella acropora =

Species of gastropod

Turritella acropora, the boring turret snail, is a species of sea snail, a marine gastropod mollusc in the family Turritellidae, the turret snails.

== Description ==
=== External shell and structure ===
The shell of T. acropora is elongate conical, ranging in height from 10-41mm. The approximately 15 convex rounded whorls of the teleoconch are distinctly impressed at the sutures. The shell has a spiral sculpture of primary and secondary cords which are closely set. The columella is thin. The shell has a round aperture with no siphonal canal. The color in specimen photos typically shows a white to sandy tan colored base with darker axial bands.

=== Live snail ===
T. acropora utilizes stemmata for vision.

== Distribution and habitat ==
T. acropora occurs in the Gulf of Mexico and the Caribbean Sea, as well as the Atlantic Ocean off the coast of the eastern United States, extending as far north as North Carolina. Specimens are primarily found between the depths of 10-80 meters below the surface. Few documented specimens are stated to have been found at 300-400 meters below the surface. T. acropora is a marine benthic species.

== Life habits ==
=== Diet ===
T. acropora is a suspension feeder.

=== Reproduction ===
T. acropora is a gonochoric species that reproduces sexually.

=== Locomotion ===
T. acropora moves by mucus mediated gliding.
