= Turritella anactor =

Scientific classification
- Kingdom: Animalia
- Phylum: Mollusca
- Class: Gastropoda
- Subclass: Caenogastropoda
- Order: incertae sedis
- Family: Turritellidae
- Genus: Turritella
- Species: T. anactor

Binomial name
- Turritella anactor Berry, 1957

Species of gastropod

Turritella anactor, common name the master screw shell, is a species of sea snail, a marine gastropod mollusk in the family Turritellidae.

== Description ==
=== Exterior shell and structure ===
The height of the shell ranges from 100-145 mm, the width of the shell about 30 mm. The shape of the shell is elongate conical with a sharply pointed apex. The teleoconch has approximately 15-20 whorls that are slightly concave with a notably beveled keel at the anterior end of the sutures in a spiral structure. The color of the shell is a mottled grey-yellow with curved axial stripes of darker brown. Specimen photos show the shell having a lighter, almost white apex. The aperture is rounded or ovular with a thin outer lip and lacks a siphonal canal. T. anactor has a corneous operculum that fills the aperture completely.

== Distribution and habitat ==
T. anactor is a marine benthic species that is found in the eastern Pacific Ocean off the coast of Baja California, Mexico. Specimens have been documented as being found in mud flats, consistent with the habitat preference of other Turritellidae species.

== Life habits ==
=== Diet ===
Species in Turritellidae are suspension feeders. Species in this family consume microorganisms suspended in the water the gastropods reside in, including detritus, plankton, and other organic matter.

=== Reproduction ===
Turritellidae species reproduce sexually and are likely gonochoric.

=== Locomotion ===
T. anactor moves by mucus mediated gliding.
