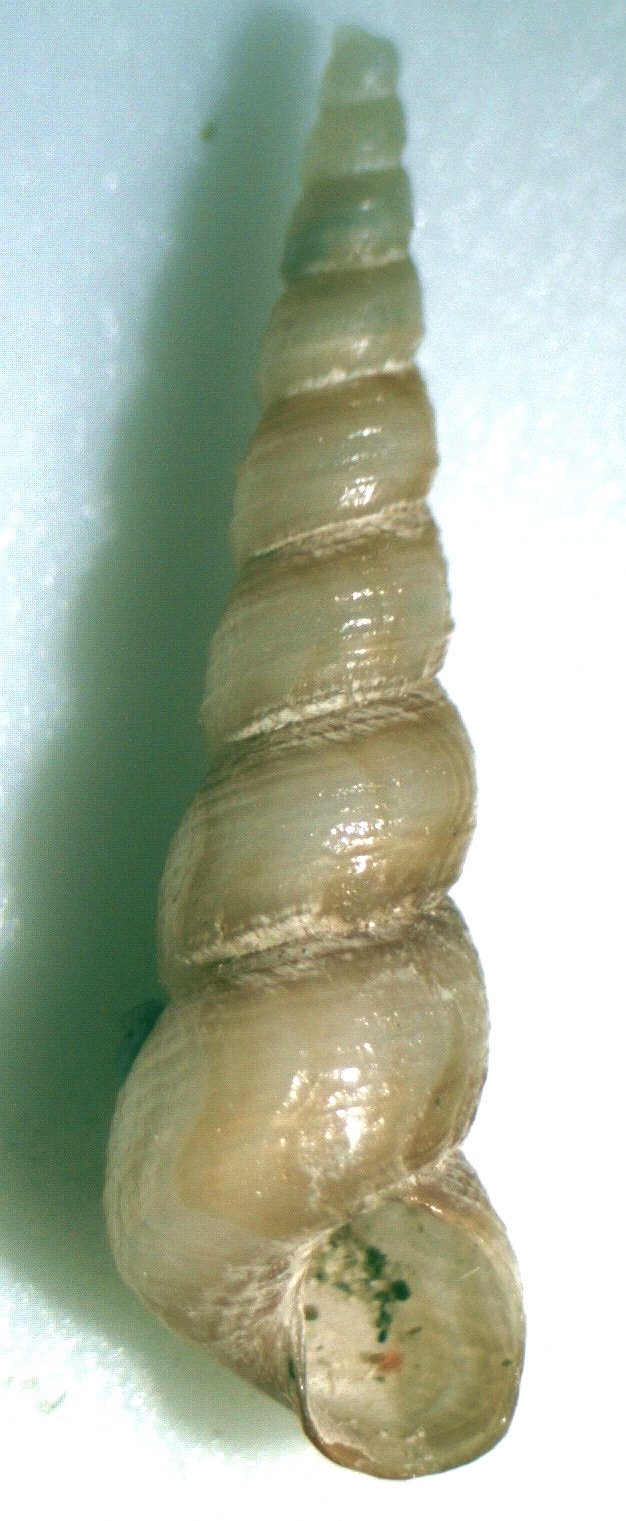
- Apertural view of a shell Turritella cingulifera

Scientific classification
- Kingdom: Animalia
- Phylum: Mollusca
- Class: Gastropoda
- Subclass: Caenogastropoda
- Order: incertae sedis
- Family: Turritellidae
- Genus: Turritella
- Species: T. cingulifera

Binomial name
- Turritella cingulifera G. B. Sowerby I, 1825

Synonyms
- Haustator (Kurosioia) cingulata sensu Okutani, 1975; Haustator cingulifera; Haustator (Kurosioia) cingulifera; Torcula parva Angas, 1877; Turritella (Haustator) canaliculata Adams & Reeve, 1850; Turritella (Haustator) cingulifera G. B. Sowerby I, 1825; Turritella (Haustator) multilirata Adams & Reeve, 1850; Turritella canaliculata Adams & Reeve in Reeve, 1849; Turritella fascialis Menke, 1830; Turritella fragilis Kiener, 1873; Turritella fuscotincta Petit, 1853; Turritella gracillima Gould, 1861; Turritella multilirata Adams & Reeve in Reeve, 1849; Turritella noumeensis G. B. Sowerby III, 1914; Turritella parva (Angas, 1877); Turritella tricarinata King, 1832 nec Brocchi 1814 (secondary homonym, not to be confused with the species described by Brocchi)

= Turritella cingulifera =

Species of gastropod

Turritella cingulifera is a species of sea snail, a marine gastropod mollusk in the family Turritellidae.

It is placed either in subgenus Kurosioia or Haustator.

== Distribution ==
This marine species is found in the sublittoral zone of Australian waters, the Indo-Pacific Region and the East China Sea.

== Description ==
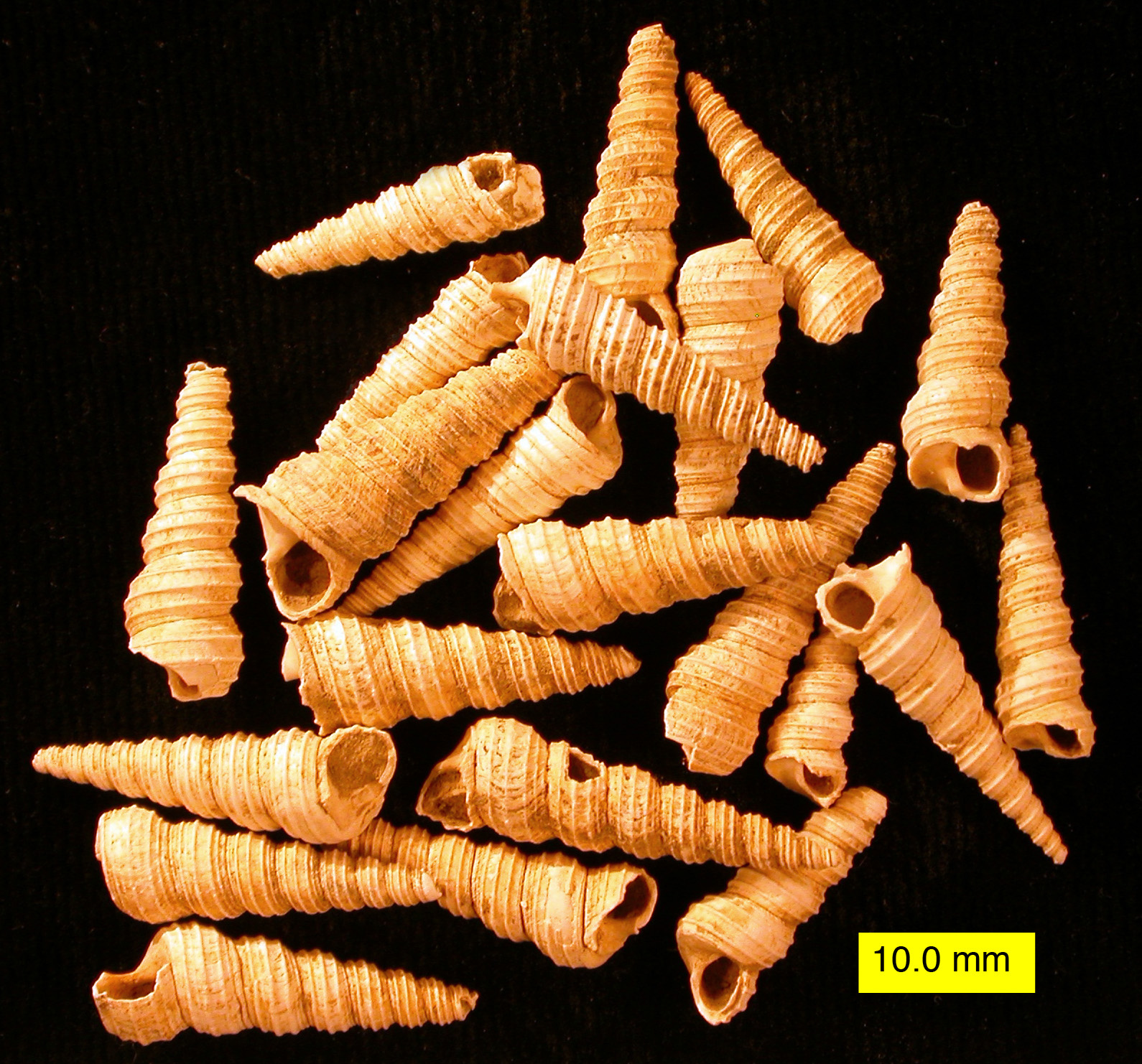
Turritella cingulifera from the Pliocene of Cyprus

The slender conical shell is whitish to yellowish brown with a chestnut band next to the suture. The shell sometimes has undulating, transverse chestnut lines or a central chestnut band made up of two or three close parallel lines on the body whorl. The shell has about twelve whorls. They are contracted between the deep suture and then rounded with a number of thin, elevated, spiral striae. The length of the shell is 1,90 cm (.75-inch).

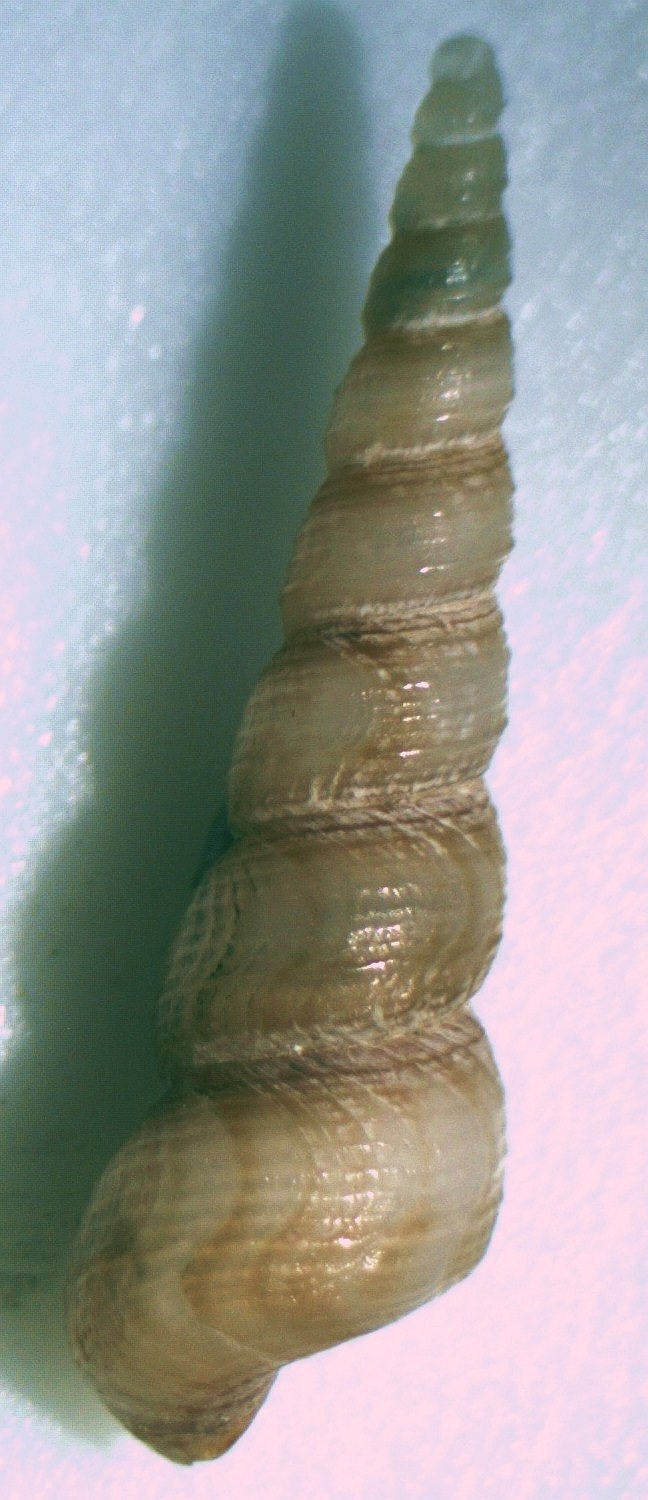
abapertural view of the shell
