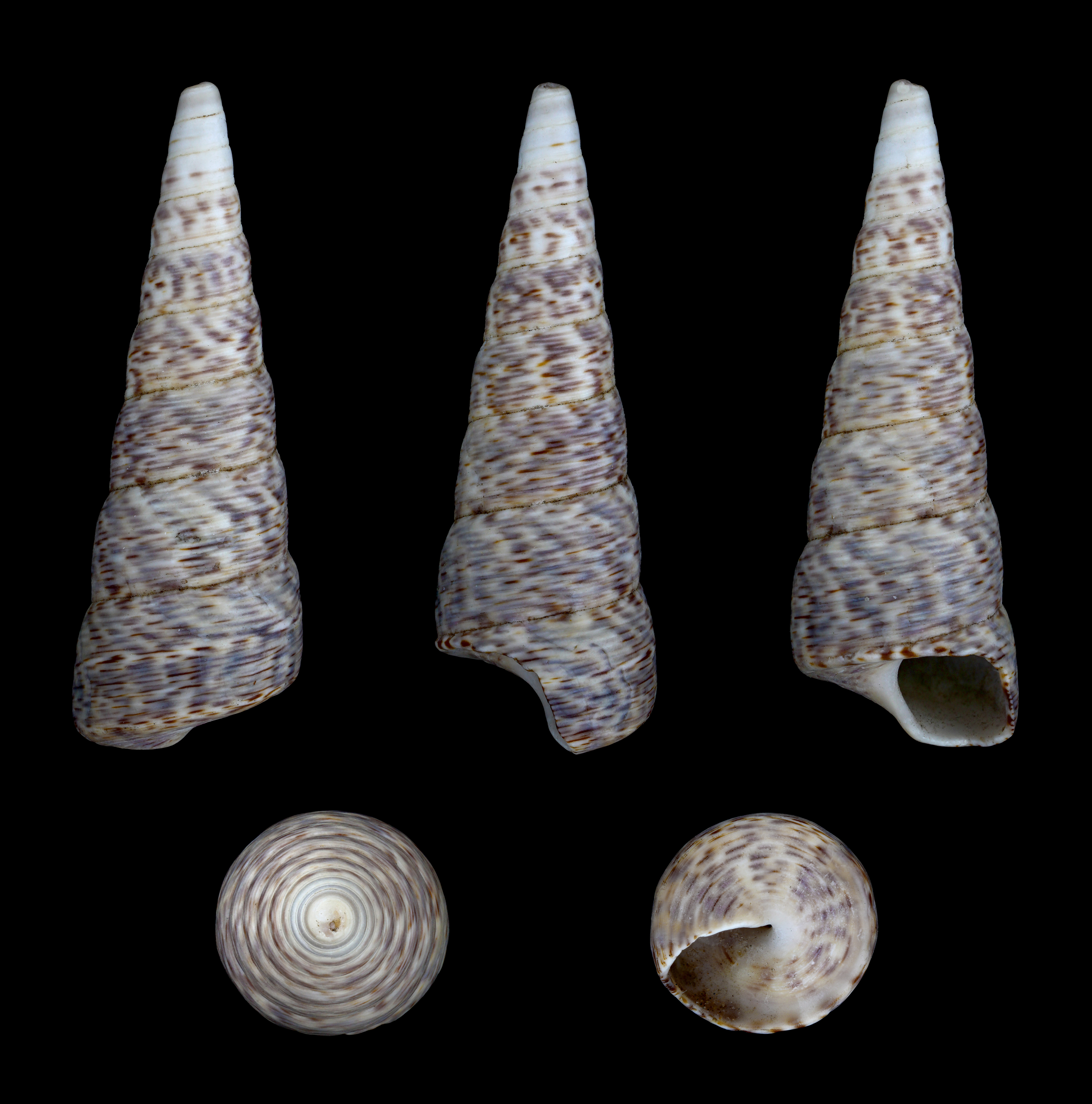
- Five views of a shell of Turritella lentiginosa

Scientific classification
- Kingdom: Animalia
- Phylum: Mollusca
- Class: Gastropoda
- Subclass: Caenogastropoda
- Order: incertae sedis
- Family: Turritellidae
- Genus: Turritella
- Species: T. lentiginosa

Binomial name
- Turritella lentiginosa Reeve, 1849

= Turritella lentiginosa =

Species of gastropod

Turritella lentiginosa is a species of sea snail, a marine gastropod mollusk in the family Turritellidae.
