= Turritella lindae =

Scientific classification
- Kingdom: Animalia
- Phylum: Mollusca
- Class: Gastropoda
- Subclass: Caenogastropoda
- Order: incertae sedis
- Family: Turritellidae
- Genus: Turritella
- Species: T. lindae

Binomial name
- Turritella lindae (Petuch, 1987)

Synonyms
- Turritella (Torcula) lindae Petuch, 1987

Species of gastropod

Turritella lindae is a species of sea snail, a marine gastropod mollusk in the family Turritellidae.

== Description ==
Original description: "Shell elongated, average size and shape for subgenus Torcula; whorls ornamented with 5 large cords with numerous fine threads in between; anteriormost 3 cords larger, intersected by large vertical ribs; 12 ribs per whorl on holotype, suture slightly keeled; protoconch comprising 3 whorls; protoconch and early whorls bright purple in color; shell color white with scattered fine purple and brown dots."

== Distribution ==
Locus typicus: "(Dredged from) 150 metres depth,
50 kilometres South of Apalachicola, Florida, USA."
