= Turritella ungulina =

Scientific classification
- Kingdom: Animalia
- Phylum: Mollusca
- Class: Gastropoda
- Subclass: Caenogastropoda
- Order: incertae sedis
- Family: Turritellidae
- Genus: Turritella
- Species: T. ungulina

Binomial name
- Turritella ungulina (Linnaeus, 1758)

Synonyms
- Turbo ungulinus Linnaeus, 1758

Species of gastropod

Turritella ungulina is a species of sea snail, a marine gastropod mollusk in the family Turritellidae.
