= Turritella radula =

Scientific classification
- Kingdom: Animalia
- Phylum: Mollusca
- Class: Gastropoda
- Subclass: Caenogastropoda
- Order: incertae sedis
- Family: Turritellidae
- Genus: Turritella
- Species: T. radula

Binomial name
- Turritella radula Kiener, 1843

Species of gastropod

Turritella radula is a species of sea snail, a marine gastropod mollusk in the family Turritellidae. The Mollusk is found in the south-eastern Bioregion, it is found mainly in Santa Cruz. Mexico, Acapulco, Ecuador and the Galapagos islands.

== Description ==
Shell size 45-50 mm.

== Distribution ==
Bioregions: South-eastern. Galapagos island groups: Santa Cruz. Mexico, Acapulco, West coast of Panama, Ecuador including Galapagos islands.
