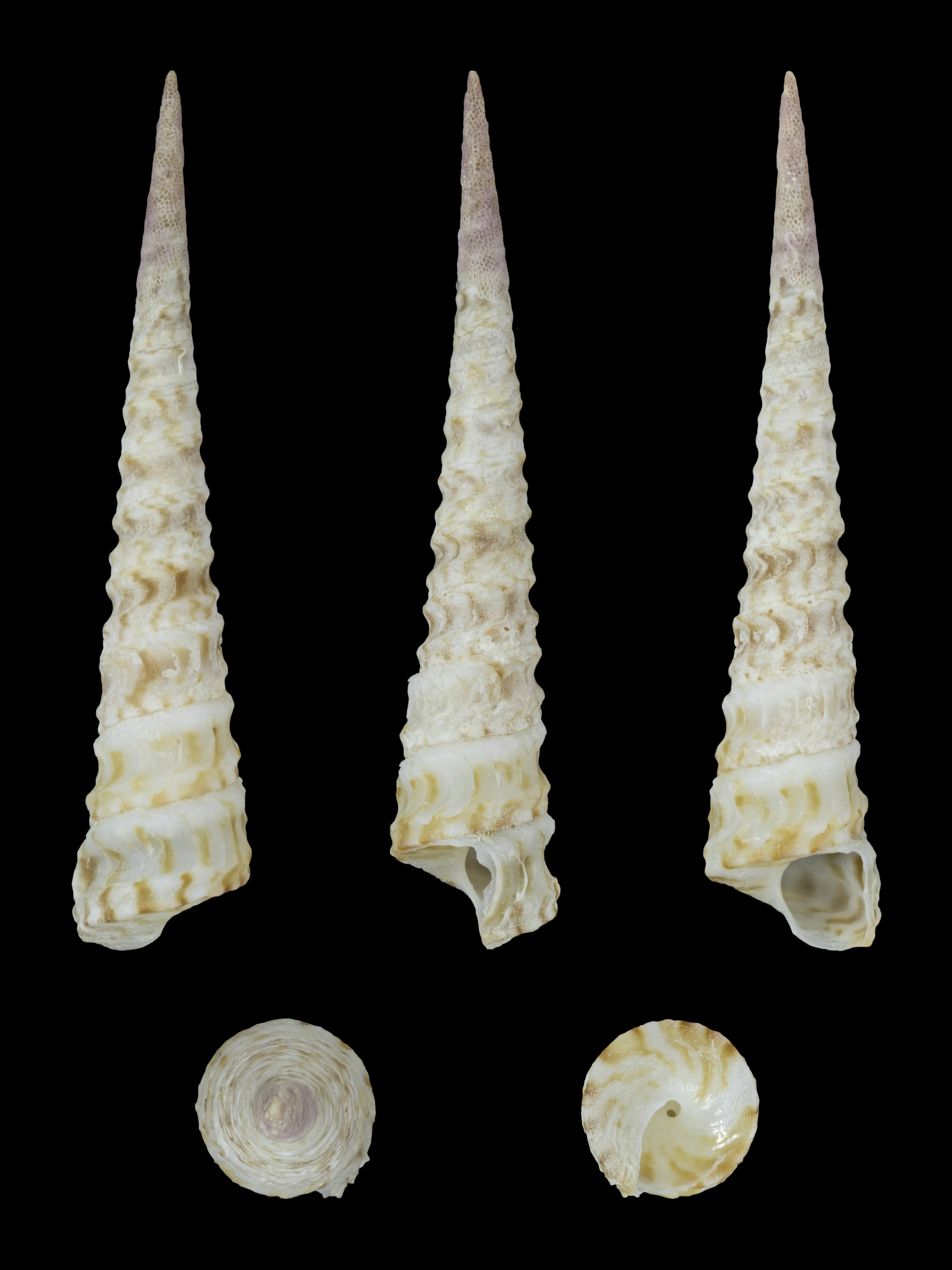

Scientific classification
- Kingdom: Animalia
- Phylum: Mollusca
- Class: Gastropoda
- Subclass: Caenogastropoda
- Order: incertae sedis
- Family: Turritellidae
- Genus: Turritella
- Species: T. exoleta

Binomial name
- Turritella exoleta (Linnaeus, 1758)

Synonyms
- Turbo exoletus Linnaeus, 1758; Turbo obsoletus Gmelin, 1791; Turbo torcularis Born, 1778; Turritella (Torcula) exoleta (Linnaeus, 1758); Turritella (Torcula) exoleta var. gracilior Mörch, 1876

= Turritella exoleta =

Species of gastropod

Turritella exoleta is a species of sea snail, a marine gastropod mollusk in the family Turritellidae.
