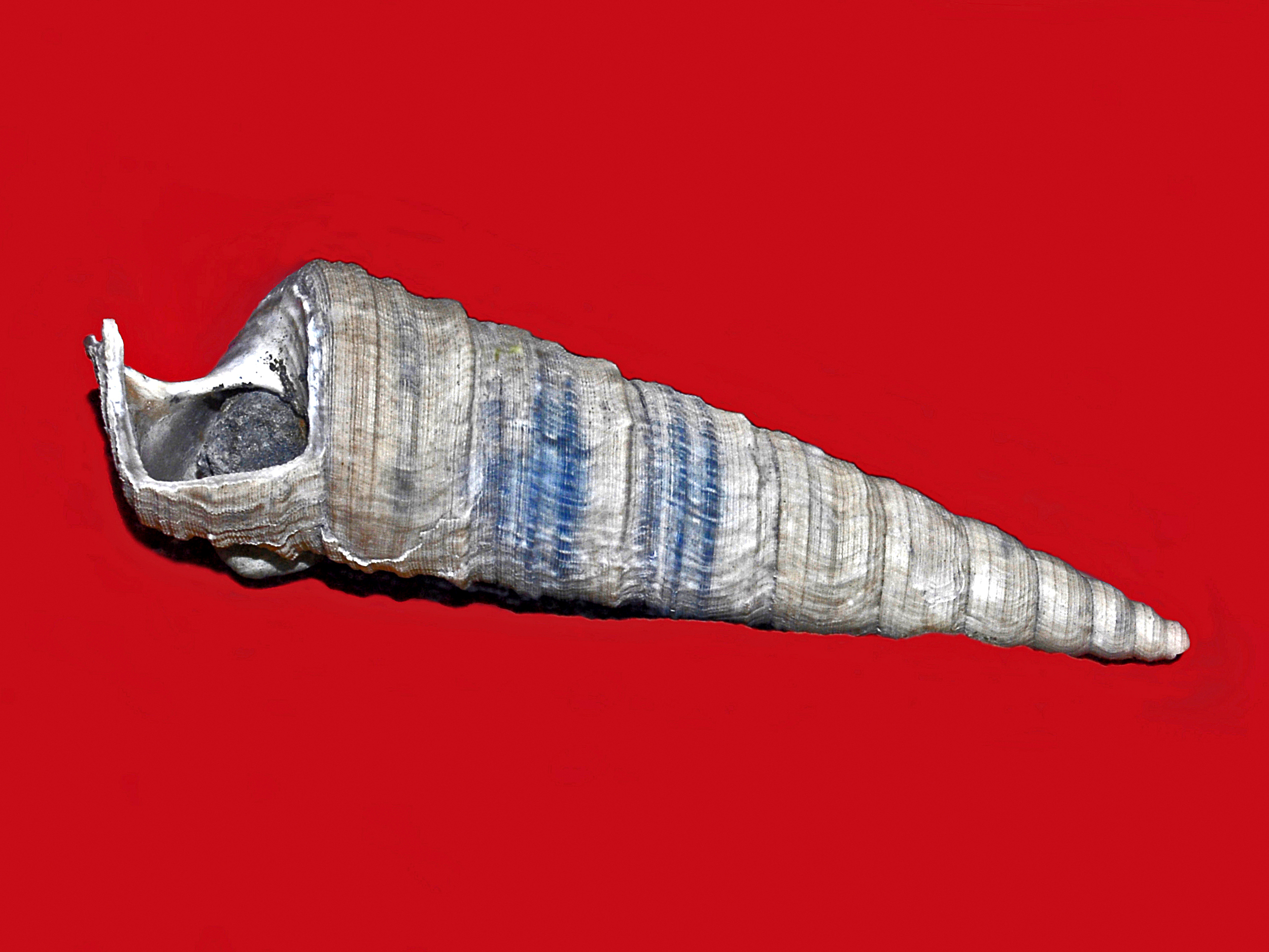
- Fossil shell of Turritella vermicularis from Pliocene of Italy

Scientific classification
- Kingdom: Animalia
- Phylum: Mollusca
- Class: Gastropoda
- Subclass: Caenogastropoda
- Order: incertae sedis
- Family: Turritellidae
- Genus: Turritella
- Species: T. vermicularis

Binomial name
- Turritella vermicularis (Brocchi, 1814)

= Turritella vermicularis =

Extinct species of gastropod

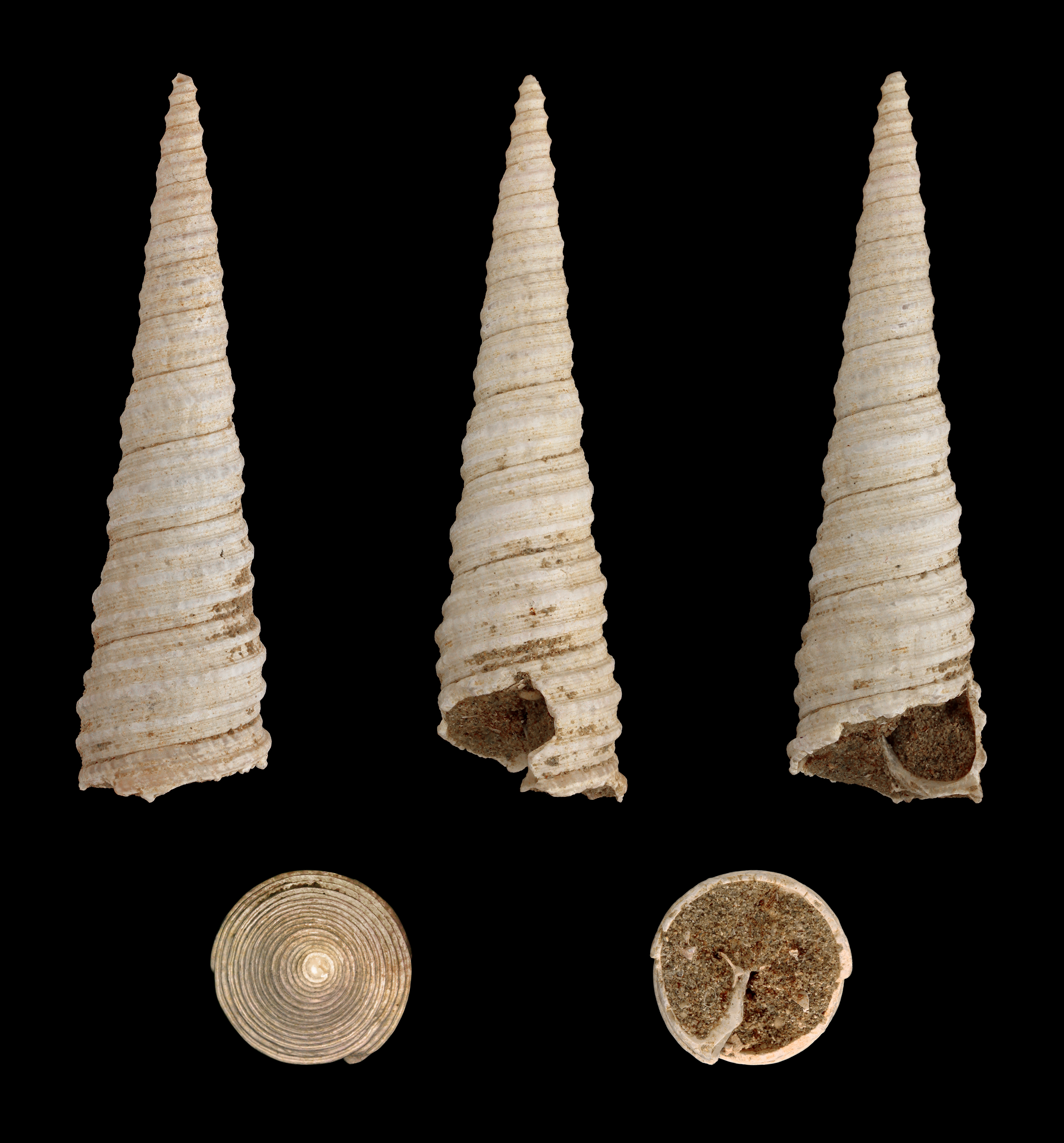
Fossil shells of Turritella vermicularis

Turritella vermicularis is an extinct species of sea snail, a marine gastropod mollusk in the family Turritellidae.

These sea snails lived from the Miocene to the Pliocene epoch, approximately from 37.2 to 2.588 million years ago.

== Description ==
Shells of Turritella vermicularis can reach a size of 28–83 millimetres (1.1–3.3 in).

== Distribution ==
Fossils have been found in the Pliocene sediments in Italy and Spain, in the Miocene of Austria, Italy and Romania and in the Eocene of Namibia.
