= Turritella rubescens =

Scientific classification
- Kingdom: Animalia
- Phylum: Mollusca
- Class: Gastropoda
- Subclass: Caenogastropoda
- Order: incertae sedis
- Family: Turritellidae
- Genus: Turritella
- Species: T. rubescens

Binomial name
- Turritella rubescens Reeve, 1849

Species of gastropod

Turritella rubescens is a species of sea snail, a marine gastropod mollusk in the family Turritellidae.
