= Turritella decipiens =

Scientific classification
- Kingdom: Animalia
- Phylum: Mollusca
- Class: Gastropoda
- Subclass: Caenogastropoda
- Order: incertae sedis
- Family: Turritellidae
- Genus: Turritella
- Species: T. decipiens

Binomial name
- Turritella decipiens Monterosato, 1878

Species of gastropod

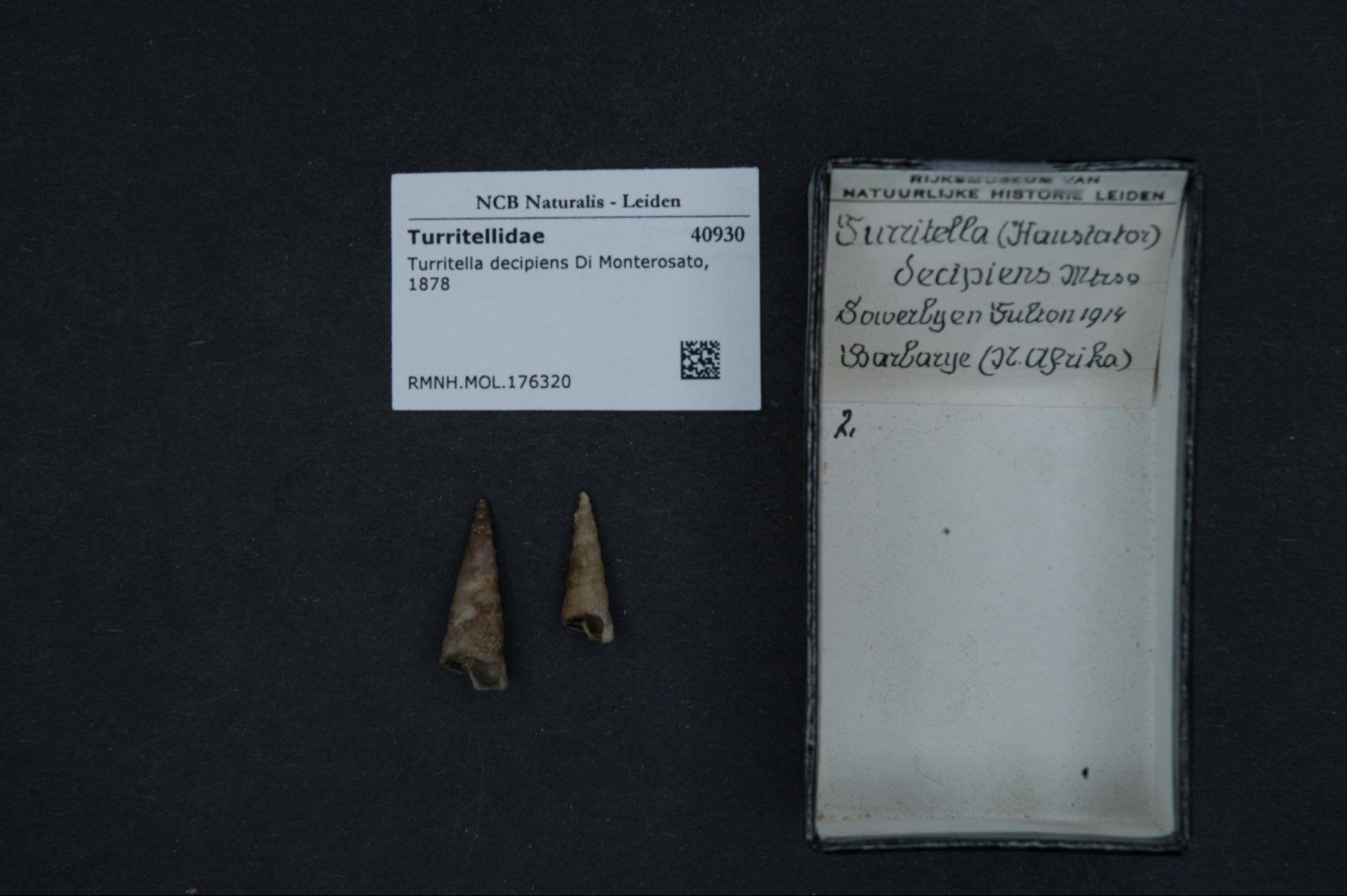
Turritella decipiens Di Monterosato, 1878 specimen

Turritella decipiens is a species of sea snail, a marine gastropod mollusk in the family Turritellidae.
