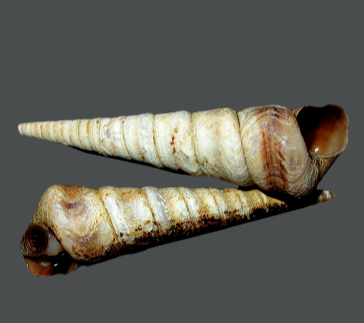
- Shell of Turritella declivis

Scientific classification
- Kingdom: Animalia
- Phylum: Mollusca
- Class: Gastropoda
- Subclass: Caenogastropoda
- Order: incertae sedis
- Family: Turritellidae
- Genus: Turritella
- Species: T. declivis

Binomial name
- Turritella declivis Adams & Reeve, 1850

Synonyms
- Gazameda declivis (Adams & Reeve, 1850); Turritella (Haustator) declivis A. Adams & Reeve, 1849 (Alternate representation); Turritella (Torcula) excavata G. B. Sowerby II, 1870 (junior synonym); Turritella excavata G. B. Sowerby III, 1870

= Turritella declivis =

Species of gastropod

Turritella declivis is a species of sea snail, a marine gastropod mollusk in the family Turritellidae.

== Description ==
The shell can reach a maximum length of 100 mm, though it typically measures less than 65 mm.

The shell is long and slender, with whorls that are flattened or slightly concave, giving them an inwardly hollowed appearance. The base of the body whorl is angular, and the aperture is small, slightly flaring at the base. The surface is marked by fine, curved axial growth lines that fade on the lower part of each whorl. There is no spiral sculpture present. The outer lip is thin and often shows signs of damage.

The shell is cream-colored, featuring a broad brown spiral band around the mid-whorl. In some specimens, the shell surface may be etched, causing the coloration to appear less distinct. Juveniles often display brown spots just below the suture.

== Distribution ==
This marine species is endemic to South Africa. It is common on the Agulhas Bank (Kei River to False Bay), in places hugely abundant and dominating the marine benthos; also found on West Coast, but evidently in much lower numbers
