= Turritella carinifera =

Scientific classification
- Kingdom: Animalia
- Phylum: Mollusca
- Class: Gastropoda
- Subclass: Caenogastropoda
- Order: incertae sedis
- Family: Turritellidae
- Genus: Turritella
- Species: T. carinifera

Binomial name
- Turritella carinifera Lamarck, 1822

Synonyms
- Turritella (Torcula) carinifera Lamarck, 1822 (Alternate representation); Turritella carinifera var. angusta W. H. Turton, 1932; Turritella kowiensis G. B. Sowerby III, 1900

Species of gastropod

Turritella carinifera is a species of sea snail, a marine gastropod mollusk in the family Turritellidae.
