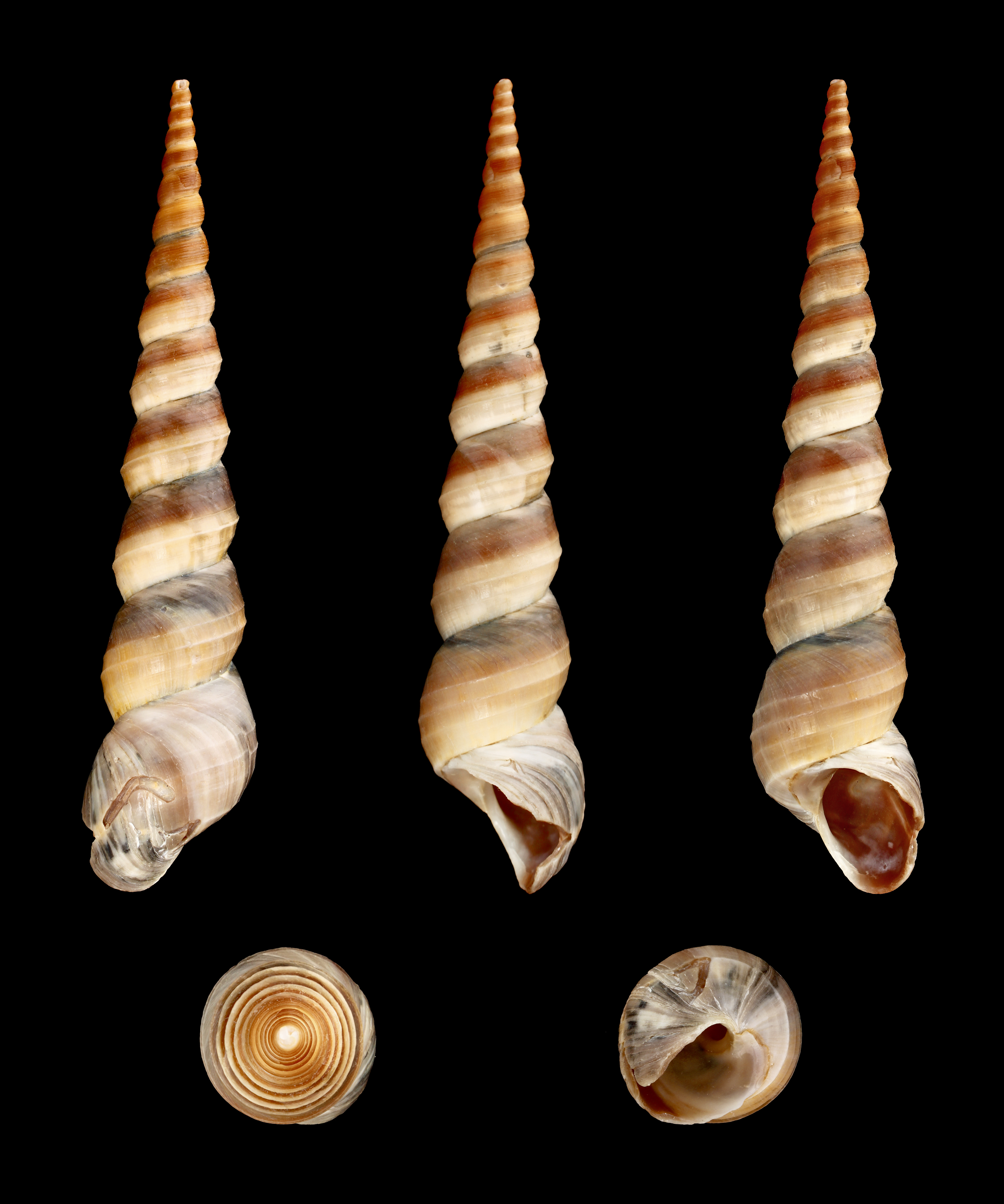

Scientific classification
- Kingdom: Animalia
- Phylum: Mollusca
- Class: Gastropoda
- Subclass: Caenogastropoda
- Order: incertae sedis
- Family: Turritellidae
- Genus: Turritella
- Species: T. duplicata

Binomial name
- Turritella duplicata (Linnaeus, 1758)

Synonyms
- Epitonium acutum Röding, 1798; Epitonium candidum Link, 1807; Epitonium dubium Röding, 1798; Epitonium duplicatum (Linnaeus, 1758); Epitonium rugosum Röding, 1798; Turbo duplicatus Linnaeus, 1758; Turbo replicatus Linnaeus, 1758; Turritella (Zaria) duplicata (Linnaeus, 1758) (alternate representation); Turritella replicata (Linnaeus, 1758)

= Turritella duplicata =

Species of gastropod

Turritella duplicata is a species of sea snail, a marine gastropod mollusk in the family Turritellidae.

== Distribution ==
This marine species occurs in the Bay of Bengal off the coast around Tharangambadi, Tamil Nadu, India.
