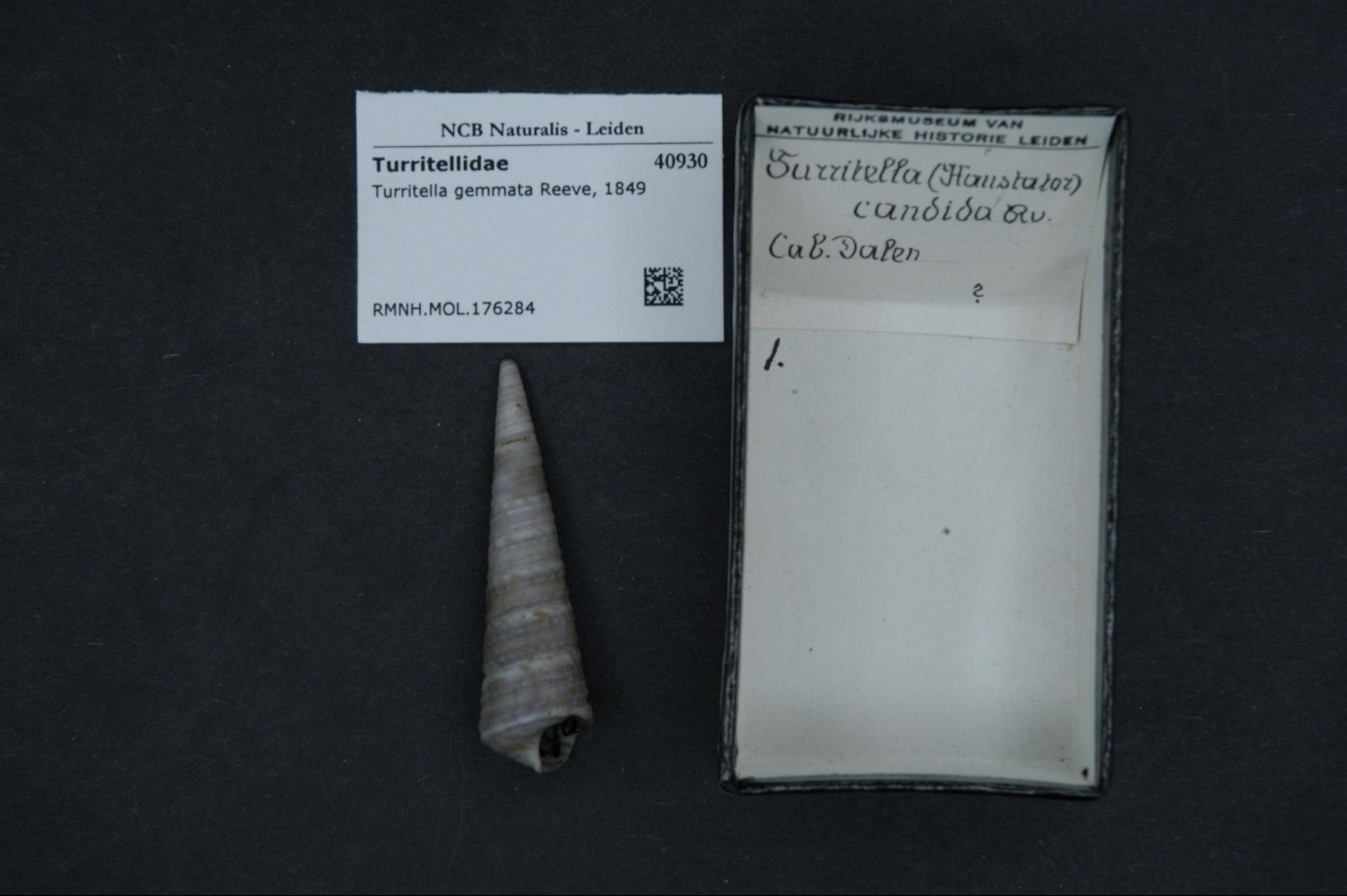
- Specimen of the Turritella Gemmata

Scientific classification
- Kingdom: Animalia
- Phylum: Mollusca
- Class: Gastropoda
- Subclass: Caenogastropoda
- Order: incertae sedis
- Family: Turritellidae
- Genus: Turritella
- Species: T. gemmata

Binomial name
- Turritella gemmata Reeve, 1849

Synonyms
- Turritella candida Reeve, 1849; Turritella meta Reeve, 1849

= Turritella gemmata =

Species of gastropod

Turritella gemmata is a species of sea snail, a marine gastropod mollusk in the family Turritellidae.

== Distribution ==
This species can be found from Cocobeach to Libreville (Gabon)
