= Glyptozaria columnaria =

Scientific classification
- Kingdom: Animalia
- Phylum: Mollusca
- Class: Gastropoda
- Subclass: Caenogastropoda
- Order: incertae sedis
- Family: Cerithiidae
- Genus: Glyptozaria
- Species: G. columnaria

Binomial name
- Glyptozaria columnaria Cotton & Woods, 1935

Species of gastropod

Glyptozaria columnaria is a species of sea snail, a marine gastropod mollusk in the family Turritellidae.
