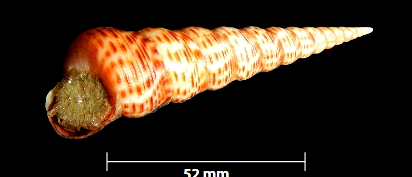
- Shell of Turritella sanguinea

Scientific classification
- Kingdom: Animalia
- Phylum: Mollusca
- Class: Gastropoda
- Subclass: Caenogastropoda
- Order: incertae sedis
- Family: Turritellidae
- Genus: Turritella
- Species: T. sanguinea

Binomial name
- Turritella sanguinea Reeve, 1849

Synonyms
- Turritella (Haustator) sanguinea Reeve, 1849; Turritella puncticulata G. B. Sowerby II, 1870; Turritella punctulata G. B. Sowerby II, 1870 (Incorrect subsequent spelling of synonym); Turritella salisburyi Tomlin, 1925 (Original combination - Synonym); Turritella sanguinea salisburyi Tomlin, 1925; Turritella sanguinea sanguinea Reeve, 1849

= Turritella sanguinea =

Species of gastropod

Turritella sanguinea is a species of sea snail, a marine gastropod mollusk in the family Turritellidae.

== Description ==
The length of the shell varies between 30 mm and 45 mm.

The shell is relatively large, many-whorled, and long and slender, tapering gradually toward the apex. The whorls are convex, rounded outward, and are sculpted with relatively uniform, rounded or flat-topped spiral cords. The surface is dull, and the basal angle is not marked by a stronger spiral cord. The aperture is rounded, and the outer lip is shallowly concave.

The color ranges from cream to buff, with reddish-brown dashes along the spiral cords, occasionally forming axial flame-like patterns or bands.

== Distribution ==
This marine species is endemic to South Africa and occurs off Port Alfred to Southern KwaZulu-Natal, South Africa at depths between 30 m and 120 m.
