= Glyptozaria opulenta =

Scientific classification
- Kingdom: Animalia
- Phylum: Mollusca
- Class: Gastropoda
- Subclass: Caenogastropoda
- Order: incertae sedis
- Family: Cerithiidae
- Genus: Glyptozaria
- Species: G. opulenta

Binomial name
- Glyptozaria opulenta (Hedley, 1907)

Synonyms
- Turritella opulenta Hedley, 1907

Species of gastropod

Glyptozaria opulenta is a species of sea snail, a marine gastropod mollusk in the family Turritellidae.
