= Tachyrhynchus reticulatus =

Scientific classification
- Kingdom: Animalia
- Phylum: Mollusca
- Class: Gastropoda
- Subclass: Caenogastropoda
- Order: incertae sedis
- Family: Turritellidae
- Genus: Tachyrhynchus
- Species: T. reticulatus

Binomial name
- Tachyrhynchus reticulatus (Mighels & Adams, 1842)

Synonyms
- List: Alvania areolata (Stimpson, 1851); Mesalia lactea (Møller, 1842); Tachyrhynchus reticulatis; Turritella areolata Stimpson, 1851; Turritella erosa var. costata Aurivillius, 1885; Turritella lactea Møller, 1842; Turritella reticulata Mighels & Adams, 1842; Turritella reticulata var. laevior Knipowitsch, 1902

Species of gastropod

Tachyrhynchus reticulatus is a species of sea snail, a marine gastropod mollusk in the family Turritellidae.

== Description ==
The maximum recorded shell length is 24.8 mm.

== Habitat ==
Minimum recorded depth is 3 m. Maximum recorded depth is 2277 m.
