= Tropicolpus abscisus =

Scientific classification
- Kingdom: Animalia
- Phylum: Mollusca
- Class: Gastropoda
- Subclass: Caenogastropoda
- Order: incertae sedis
- Family: Turritellidae
- Genus: †Tropicolpus
- Species: †T. abscisus

Binomial name
- †Tropicolpus abscisus Finlay, 1924

Synonyms
- List: †Tropicolpus (Tropicolpus) abscisus (Suter, 1917); †Turritella (Haustator) concava Hutton, 1877; †Turritella abscisa Suter, 1917; †Turritella albolapis Finlay, 1924; †Turritella concava Hutton, 1877

Species of gastropod

Tropicolpus abscisus is an extinct species of sea snail, a marine gastropod mollusk in the family Turritellidae.
