= Turritella capensis =

Scientific classification
- Kingdom: Animalia
- Phylum: Mollusca
- Class: Gastropoda
- Subclass: Caenogastropoda
- Order: incertae sedis
- Family: Turritellidae
- Genus: Turritella
- Species: T. capensis

Binomial name
- Turritella capensis (Krauss, 1848)

Synonyms
- Protoma (Protomella) capensis (Krauss, 1848); Protoma capensis (Krauss, 1848); Protomella capensis (Krauss, 1848); Turritella knysnaensis Krauss, 1848

Species of gastropod

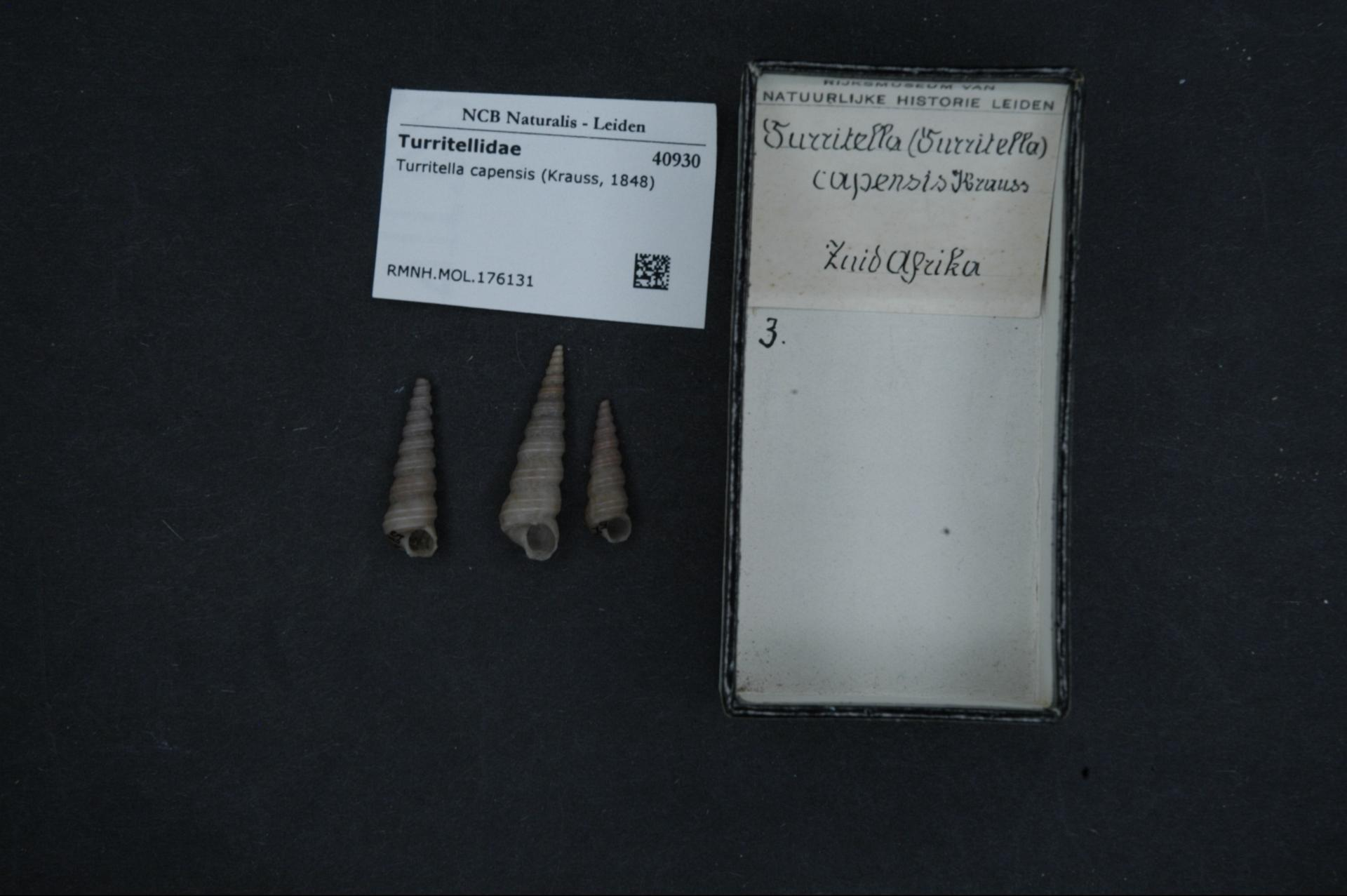

Turritella capensis, common name the waxy screw shell, is a species of sea snail, a marine gastropod mollusk in the family Turritellidae.

== Distribution ==
This marine species occurs off the coast of South Africa.
