= Coquimbo Formation =

Neogene geological formation in Chile

- Stratigraphic range: Miocene–Pleistocene, ~11–1.2 Ma
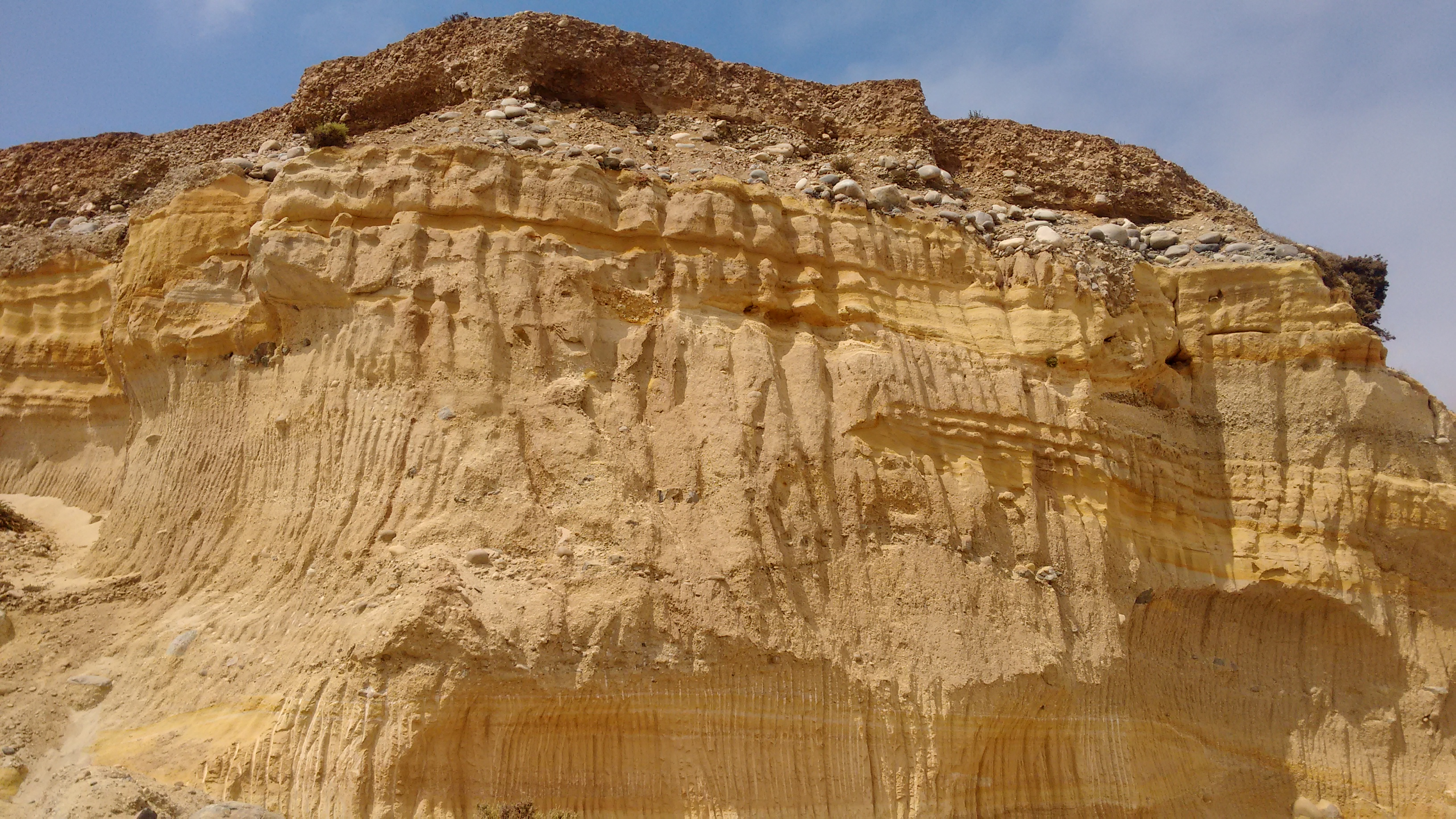
- Marine terrace exposing strata of the Coquimbo Formation, at Caleta Los Hornos
- Type: Geological formation
- Underlies: Alluvium
- Overlies: Basement
- Thickness: ~100 m (330 ft)

Lithology
- Primary: Coquina, sandstone, mudstone
- Other: Conglomerate, diatomite, limestone, phosphorite, siltstone

Location
- Region: Coquimbo Region
- Country: Chile
- Extent: Unnamed Cretaceous-Neogene basins

Type section
- Named for: Coquimbo

The Coquimbo Formation (previously known as Piso de Coquimbo or Coquimbo Stufe) is a littoral, sedimentary, and fossiliferous geological formation that chiefly crops out along the coast of the Coquimbo Region, Chile. It is dated back to the Miocene to Middle Pleistocene. The lithology of the formation comprises sands, sandstones, siltstones, limestones, coquinas, and conglomerates. The strata and facies of the Coquimbo Formation reflect a complex marine depositional history, varying from deep to shallow water paleoenvironments controlled by tectonic events and turbulent, successive changes in sea the level that developed large marine terraces within the strata which is recorded in the form of marine transgressions and regressions.

The Coquimbo Formation preserves a rich fossil marine assemblage, including molluscs, barnacles, brachiopods, fish, seabirds, and marine mammals such as cetaceans and aquatic ground sloths. As a whole, the paleoenvironments, and paleofauna of the formation have experienced strong changes and successions through time mainly due to large climatic and tectonic events. In both lithology and fossil content the Coquimbo Formation is very similar to other units of South America, such as the Pisco Formation of Peru or Bahía Inglesa Formation of the Atacama Region, which is also found in Chile.

== History ==
The Coquimbo Formation was first noted by naturalist and researcher Charles Darwin during his visit to Chile aboard HMS Beagle in the 1830s. Darwin observed prominent sedimentary structures (such as cross-stratification on marine terraces) and marine fossils (cetacean bones, shells, shark teeth, among others) of "Tertiary" age at the coast of the Coquimbo Region, approximately more than 322 km (200 mi) northward of the Navidad coast. In 1985, Steinmann G. analyzed the marine deposits around the Quiriquina Island of Bay of Concepción with observations to other deposits from Chile. He erected the term "Coquimbo Stufe" for the marine sediments along the coast of Coquimbo. Author Rubén Martínez-Pardo noted that ever since the observations made by Darwin, most of the Neogene northern-central marine deposits of Chile have been wrongly referred to this unit. Ramón Moscoso and team in 1982 published a large geologic map focused on the Atacama and Coquimbo regions of Chile, where they, in view of the confusion regarding the designation of the Coquimbo Formation, proposed to reserve the term Coquimbo Formation for the set of marine sediments located along the coastline between 28° and 30° S of the Coquimbo Region.

=== Culebrón Park ===
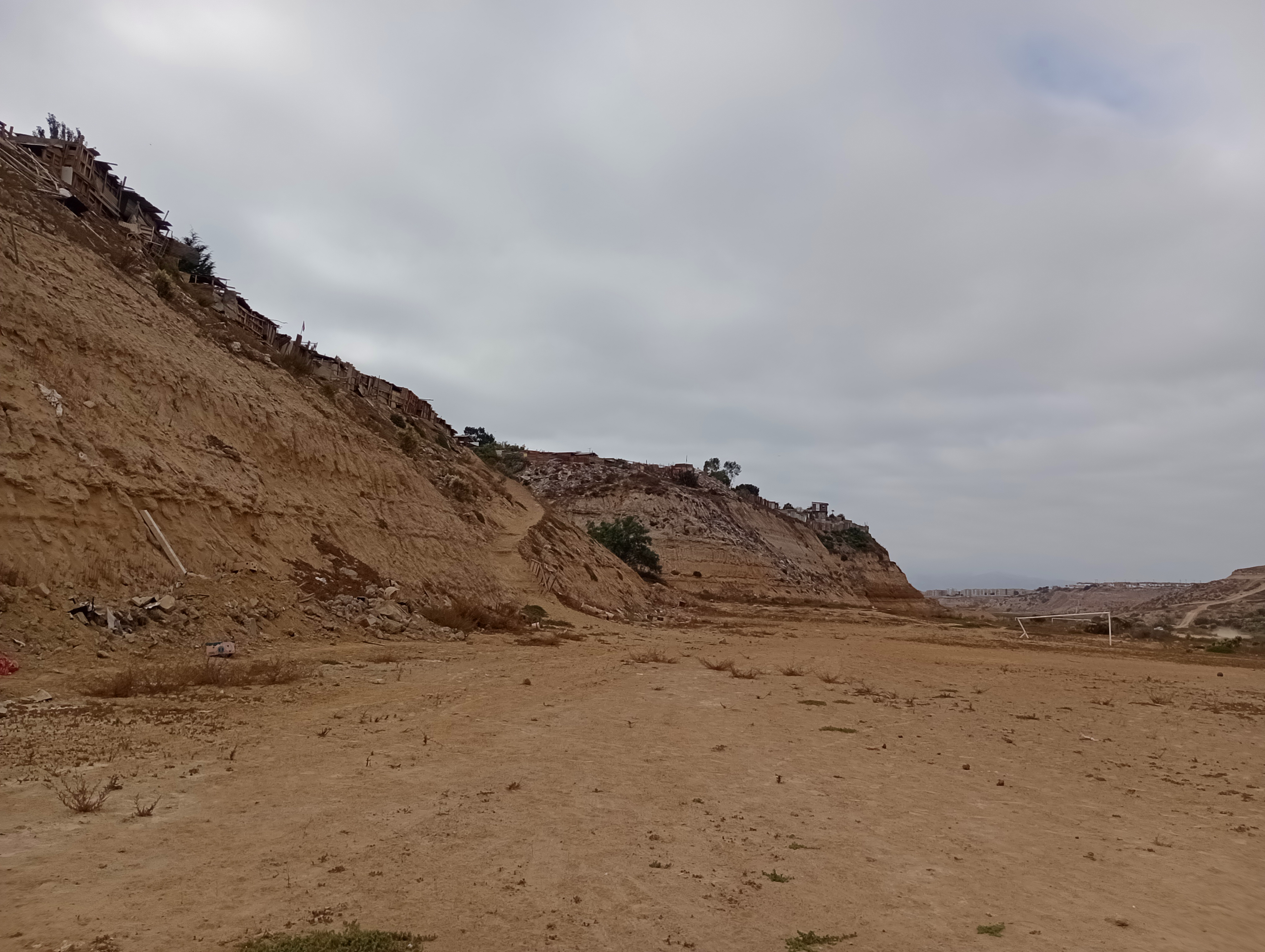
View of outcrops of the Coquimbo Formation at the Culebrón Park

Strata of the Coquimbo Formation are largely exposed across creeks and slopes of the Culebrón Park (Parque el Culebrón) of the region. Coquinas, sandstones, and other sediments, as well as abundant fossilized mollusks, can be observed all over the park. Despite the paleontological nature of the site, the Culebrón Park has undergone multiple instances of cleaning-up due to pollution caused by littering, with several areas of the park having become littering spots.

During the summer of 1984, reforestation work at the area of the Culebrón Park led by the National Forest Corporation (CONAF) revealed two relatively complete and articulated cetacean skeletons in nearby creeks with outcrops of the Coquimbo Formation. The individuals were unearthed within the same stratigraphic context from yellowish sandstones and some coquinas at a depth no greater than 40 cm (16 in), and set apart from each other by approximately 400 m (1,300 ft). Upon the discovery of such remains, the Archaeological Museum of La Serena was contacted in order to manage the fossils. The museum later reached out to the Chilean National Museum of Natural History for further study.

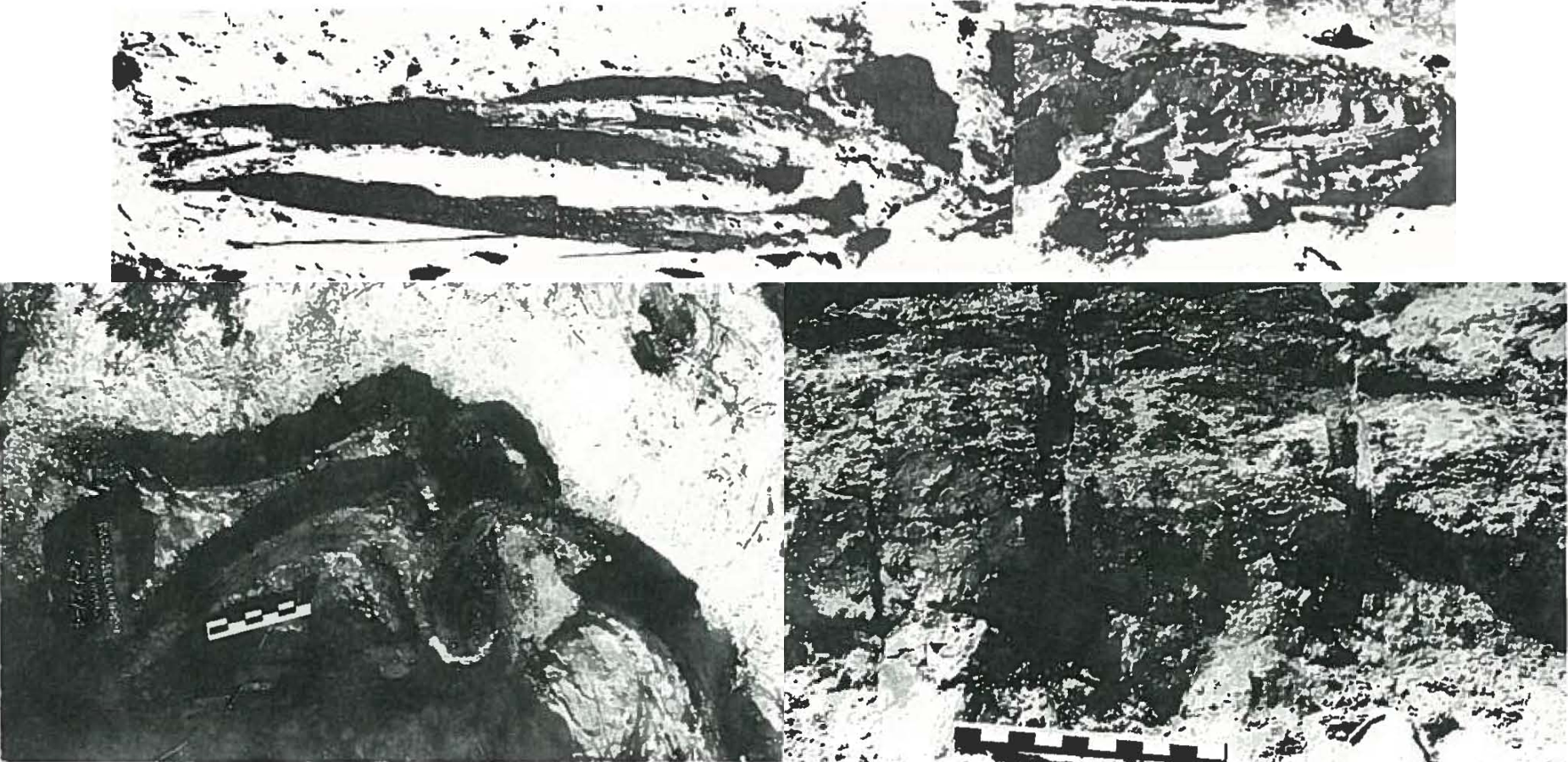
Photographs of the two fossil cetacean individuals from the Culebrón Park

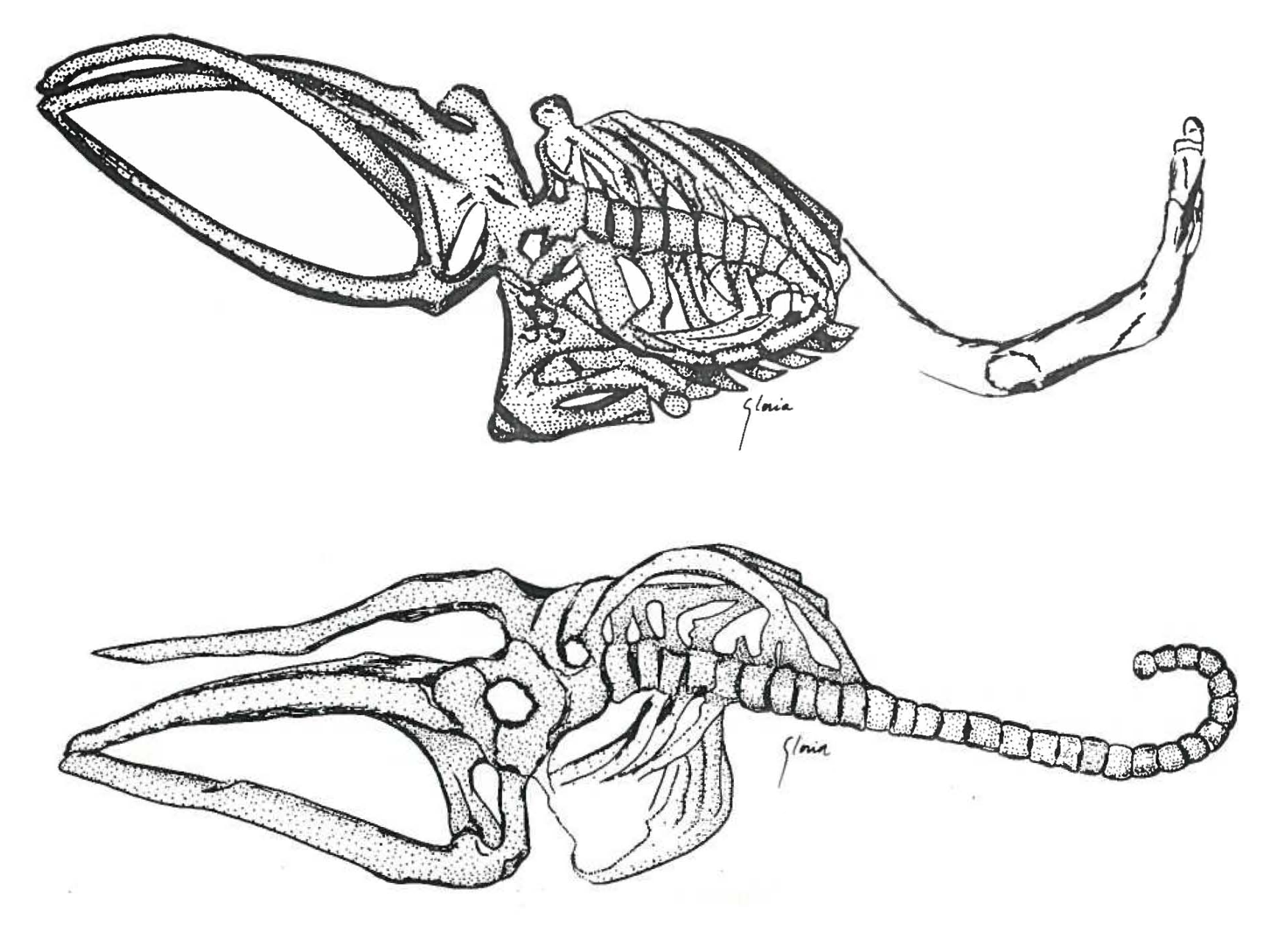
Line diagram of the cetaceans

Later in 1988, geologist Patricia Z. Salinas published a brief description of the cetaceans and overall discovery, as well as describing the strata of the Coquimbo Formation in which they were found. As stated by Salinas, the cetaceans could not be recovered and studied due to their fragile preservation and were left in field, where consolidation treatments were applied for their protection, pending the establishment of a local museum. In 1991 researchers Jose Yañez and Jhoann Canto made observations regarding the identification of the cetacean fossils, correcting their taxonomic family. In their brief note, the team also criticized the lack of a more meticulous procedure regarding the report and conservation of these valuable fossils, such as the storage of detailed photographs. Though initially reported as "semifossils" by Salinas despite their age, Yañez and Canto stated that individuals eventually dissociated in the field preventing attempts for future studies.

In 2021 the Geological Society of Chile formally recognized the Culebrón Park as a geositio (lit. geosite), that is, an important locality of either geological or paleontological value. Documentation and petitions were conducted by at-the-time Geology thesist Benjamín A. Araya, who advocated for the recognition and protection of the Culebrón Park. Although the fossiliferous value of the park and implications for the Coquimbo Formation have been in knowledge for a long time, no recognitions had ever been given before.

=== Lomas del Sauce ===
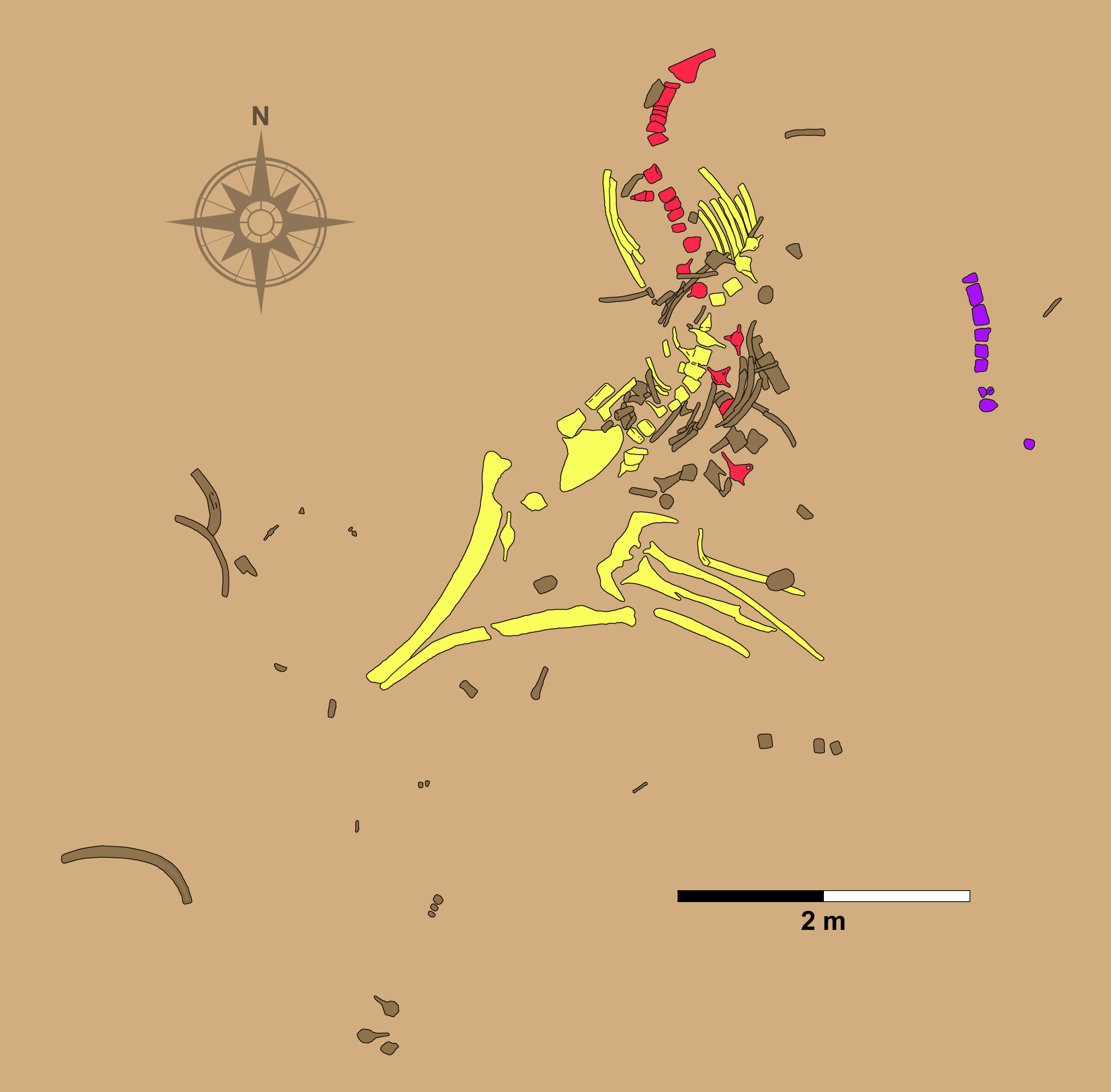
Diagram featuring the cetaceans skeletons found at Lomas del Sauce (yellow, red, and purple)

During the year 2013, geological survey was carried out on a land lot near El Sauce avenue of Coquimbo city, about 2.5 km (8,200 ft) southeast of Bahía Herradura, in the context of the real estate project Lomas del Sauce. As the lineaments progressed, abundant fossil material was discovered from fossiliferous coquinas and sandy silt assigned to the Coquimbo Formation when trial pits were performed on terrain. Out of the 10 trial pits, one yielded two or three semi-articulated cetacean skeletons including a partial skull. The fossils from this locality, mostly represented by mollusks shells and partial sea birds and fish remains, were recovered and excavated by grids, covering an area of about 32 m^{2}. Reported material was set out to be stored at the Sala de Colecciones Biológicas of the Catholic University of the North of Coquimbo.

Soil and sediment characterization of the Lomas del Sauce locality was achieved through the modelling of sub-surfaces and stratigraphic columns. Larger fossils, such as the bones of cetaceans, were extracted and secured in field jackets. Throughout the study of the locality, further fossil taxa was discovered, such as the semi-aquatic ground sloth Thalassocnus, which was previously only known from the similar Pisco Formation and Bahía Inglesa Formation. In 2017, the Thalassocnus material was formally described, contributing to the marine mammal record of the Coquimbo Formation. The specimen is now stored within the collections of the Chilean National Museum of Natural History.

== Description ==
The Coquimbo Formation belongs to a discontinuous series of Cretaceous-Neogene sedimentary basins and outcrops of the formation are located across the coasts of the Coquimbo Region, Chile, where multiple marine terraces are exposed. With about 100 m (330 ft) in thickness, the Coquimbo Formation is uncomfortably deposited over mesozoic crystalline basement composed of intrusive rocks. It consists predominantly of yellowish, sometimes phosphatized, sands, sandstones, siltstones, highly bioclastic limestones, coquinas, and conglomerates. At the locality of Carrizalillo and nearby creeks, unusual sedimentary structures are present, derived from strong tidal wave processes and elutriation.

== Depositional environment ==
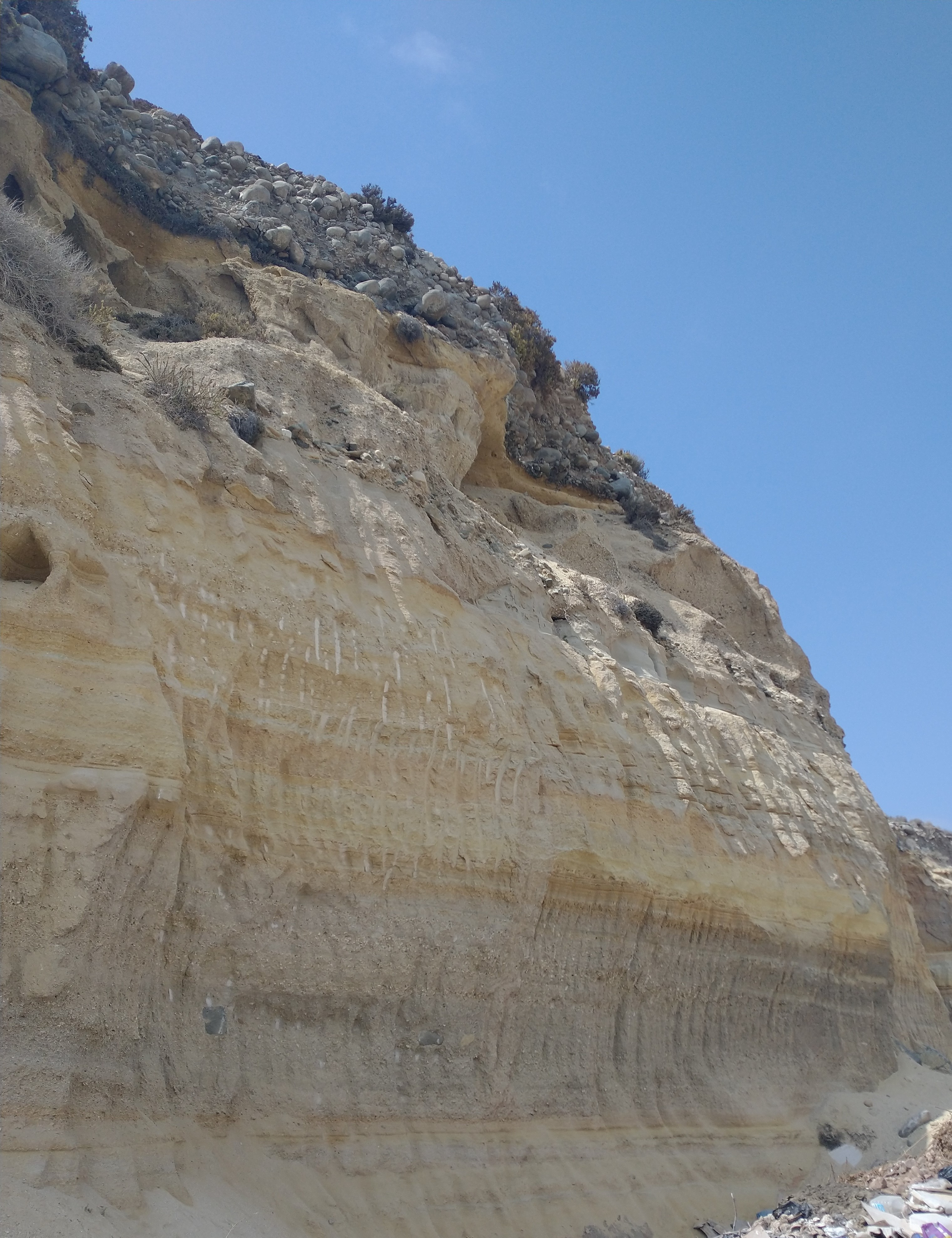
Marine terrace at Caleta Los Hornos, which follows the sequence from Quebrada Honda

Based on the record of foraminiferans at Tongoy, it has been suggested that the deposits at this area were deposited in the lower zone of a continental shelf with relatively warm waters. The sedimentological record from Quebrada Honda preserves data that can reflect two major depositional environments during its history of deposition. Towards the bottom of the sequence, sediments and fossil content (such as cetaceans, brachiopods, bivalves, and gastropods) suggests a low-energy, deep-water marine paleoenvironment with high ecological activity/dynamics. The abundance of phosphorite and marine vertebrates, the contribution of polymictic clasts (of different composition), and angular unconformities from the successive layers of strata of this section, indicates periods of turbulent rising sea levels with the posterior mark of a marine transgression which can also be reflected in the decreasing abundancy of the fossil content towards the roof of the sequence, especially brachiopods. The presence of phosphorite deposits suggests that during the deposition of sediments the environment was subject to marine upwelling, where microorganisms and vertebrate remains precipitated phosphate deposits. Towards the roof the sequence a turbulent deposition can be inferred from the abundant emergence of unconformities as well as conglomerates and coquinas likely derived from the paleofauna of the older, low-energy deposits. These events are interpreted as products from a high energy tsunami or storm tides. Quebrada El Culebrón preserves a similar sedimentological record.

The fossil record of shallow water-based taxa such as Crassostrea, Heterodontus, Incatella or Thalassocnus also suggests a shallow marine environment upon deposition. The foraminiferan fossil assemblage from Bahía de Guanaqueros indicates several changes in sea levels and depositional environments, from neritic to bathyal marine conditions. Constanza A. García in 2019 identified multiple depositional environments during the history of deposition of Quebrada Las Rosas, El Culebrón, and Los Clarines, which were characterized by alternations of marine regressions and transgressions. Many of these depositional environments are reflected in the lithology and taphonomy of fossils, such as coquinas with dissolution of calcareous material or the presence of shallow trace fossils. Diego M. Partarrieu in his 2022 doctorate thesis proposed at least four sedimentary episodes across the localities of Coquimbo, with the two oldest episodes situated in a beach depositional environment, and the two youngest episodes occurring within shallow, intermareal waters. The changes in depositional environments were also followed by rapid faunal turnover and large-scale climatic change.

=== Taphonomy ===
The changes in sea level throughout the history of deposition of the Coquimbo Formation have been also important for taphonomic alterations to fossils. At the locality of Quebrada Chañaral the fossils of vertebrates show unusual features such as their nodulization within sediments, iron and phosphate mineralization, and high roundness. In addition, many vertebrate fossils show fragmentation and erosion on their bone surfaces likely originated from long exposure to the environments. These taphonomic features are interpreted as reworking from older fossils that were ultimately deposited in younger sediments due to marine regressions. Similar conditions have reported from other discoveries, such as Thalassocnus from Lomas del Sauce. The specimen was found with most elements in articulation except for the forelimb and pelvis remains, indicating that the skeleton suffered displacement before burial. The in situ unearthing paired with the breaking of some of the bones suggests that these were broken just before or during the burial. Other taphonomic features are reported, such as the development of a phosphatic crust at the bottom of the fossiliferous bed that mineralized most elements, or the attachment of bivalve internal molds and shells onto bones.

== Geographic extent ==
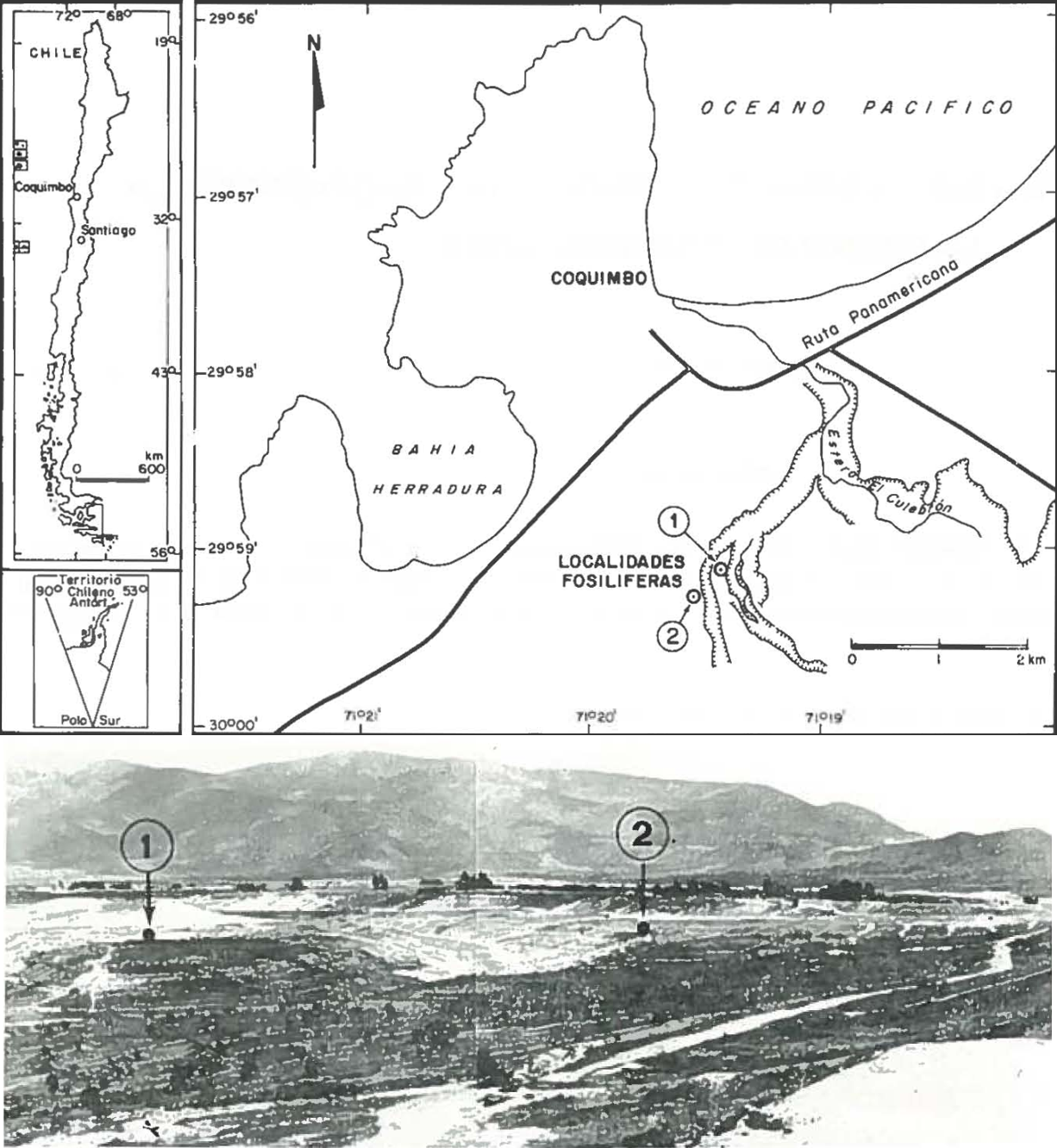
Map indicating the location of the cetaceans from Park El Culebrón, in Coquimbo city

The Coquimbo Formation is largely deposited along the coasts and creeks of the Coquimbo Region. It can be found outcropping from Tongoy city to Caleta Chañaral (and Chañaral de Aceituno). The latter does not form part of the Coquimbo Region and is instead located at the southernmost extension of the Atacama Region, making this area the northernmost extension of the Coquimbo Formation. In Tongoy, the formation runs across creeks that feature large marine terraces. In Coquimbo, the formation can be traced as far as the Culebrón Park, with a more consistent extent at Quebrada Las Rosas.

== Tectonic evolution ==
In the area of Tongoy, the Coquimbo Formation was deposited in an ancient bay that was formed in a graben or half-graben, with a normal fault dipping east derived from local and regional tectonic movement as recorded in the sedimentary successions and geological structures of this area. The tectonic movement is associated with the subduction of the Juan Fernandez Ridge and a second oceanic plateau which caused the uplifting of the continental crust and changes in the sea level, along with faulting. The marine terraces of the Coquimbo Formation are relatively large sedimentary bodies, and they were carved in these sediments as a result of the Pliocene-Quaternary marine transgressions and regressions that occurred in this area. The marine terrace levels at Coquimbo and La Herradura bays preserve unconformities that indicate that they were periodically resedimented during successive high level-sea tides, which is also supported by the aminostratigraphy of mollusks.

== Stratigraphy and age ==
The Coquimbo Formation was sedimented during the Neogene discordantly covering the basament scarps of the region, most notably the northern sector of La Serena, Carrizalillo. It is subdivided into 16 lithostratigraphic units of coastal marine origin. In ascending order these range from Unit 1 to Unit 16. The lowermost unit belongs to the lower Miocene, with the third-deepest unit dated at 11.9 ± 1.0 Ma. The uppermost unit of the formation is estimated at 1.2 Ma.

It is proposed that the Coquimbo Formation is equivalent to the Bahía Inglesa Formation. Both formations show similarities in sedimentation (such as correlation of lithostratigraphic units) and fossil content, and they could represent distinct units of the same geological formation, pending further analyses. In 2024, Benjamín A. Araya and team proposed a division of the Coquimbo Formation intro three members, characterized as a Lower Member of Tortonian-Messinian age composed of yellowish-gray muds and silts with iron and magnesium nodules, diatomites, and fine-grained sands with intercalations of coquina and phosphate deposits; a Medium Member of Messinian-Zanclean age comprising silty sands, silts, floatstone, and conglomerates; and lastly an Upper Member of Zanclean-Piacenzian age including stratified, sand-grained coquinas that are overlaid by rudstones, coarse-grained sands, and matrix-supported coquinas.

Lithostratigraphy of the Coquimbo Formation from Tongoy
Period	Epoch	Unit	Composite age	Facies	Fossil content (main)
Quaternary	Pleistocene	16	~1.2 ma.	Sandstone, limestone.	Balanus sp.
Quaternary	Pleistocene	15	~1.4±0.5 ma.	Conglomerate, calcareous conglomerate, coquina, sandstone, siltstone, mudstone.	Balanus sp., bivalves, Acanthina unicornis, Turritella sp.
Quaternary	Pleistocene	14	~2 ma.	Sandstone, siltstone, shale, mudstone.	Balanus sp., Ostrea sp., Turritella sp.
Neogene	Pliocene	13	~4.3 ma.	Conglomerate, coquina, sandstone.	Cetacean bones, Balanus sp., Ostrea sp., gastropods.
Neogene	Pliocene	12	~5 ma.	Coquina, sandstone.	Cetacean bones, Balanus sp., Chorus sp., Ostrea sp.
Neogene	Miocene	11	~5.3 ma.	Sandstone, clay.	Cetacean bones, Carcharodon carcharias teeth, fish scales, Chlamys hupeanus, Chorus sp., Ostrea sp., Balanus sp.
Neogene	Miocene	10	~6.3 ma.	Conglomerate, sandstone.	Balanus sp., bivalves, Turritella sp.
Neogene	Miocene	9	~7.3 ma.	Sandstone, siltstone, clay.	Not recorded.
Neogene	Miocene	8	~9±1.0 ma.	Conglomerate, sandstone, siltstone.	Balanus sp., Ostrea sp., gastropods.
Neogene	Miocene	7	~9.5 ma.	Sandstone, siltstone, shale, clay.	Gastropods.
Neogene	Miocene	6	~10.1 ma.	Conglomerate, coquina, sandstone.	Balanus sp., Chlamys sp., Crepidula sp., Ostrea sp.
Neogene	Miocene	5	~10.6 ma.	Sandstone, diatomaceous clay, shale.	Not recorded.
Neogene	Miocene	4	~11.2 ma.	Tuffaceous and diatomaceous clay, siltstone, sandstone, phosphate pebble bed.	Cetacean bones, Cosmopolitodus hastalis teeth, fish scales, sponge spicules, bivalves, gastropods.
Neogene	Miocene	3	~11.9±1.0 ma.	Coquina, conglomerate.	Cetacean bones, Balanus sp., Chlamys sp., Mulinia cf. vidali, Ostrea sp., Turritella leptogramma.
Neogene	Miocene	2	Not recorded.	Brecciated sandstone.	Not recorded.
Neogene	Miocene	1	~23?–11 ma.	Coquina.	Turritella leptogramma.

== Paleobiota of the Coquimbo Formation ==
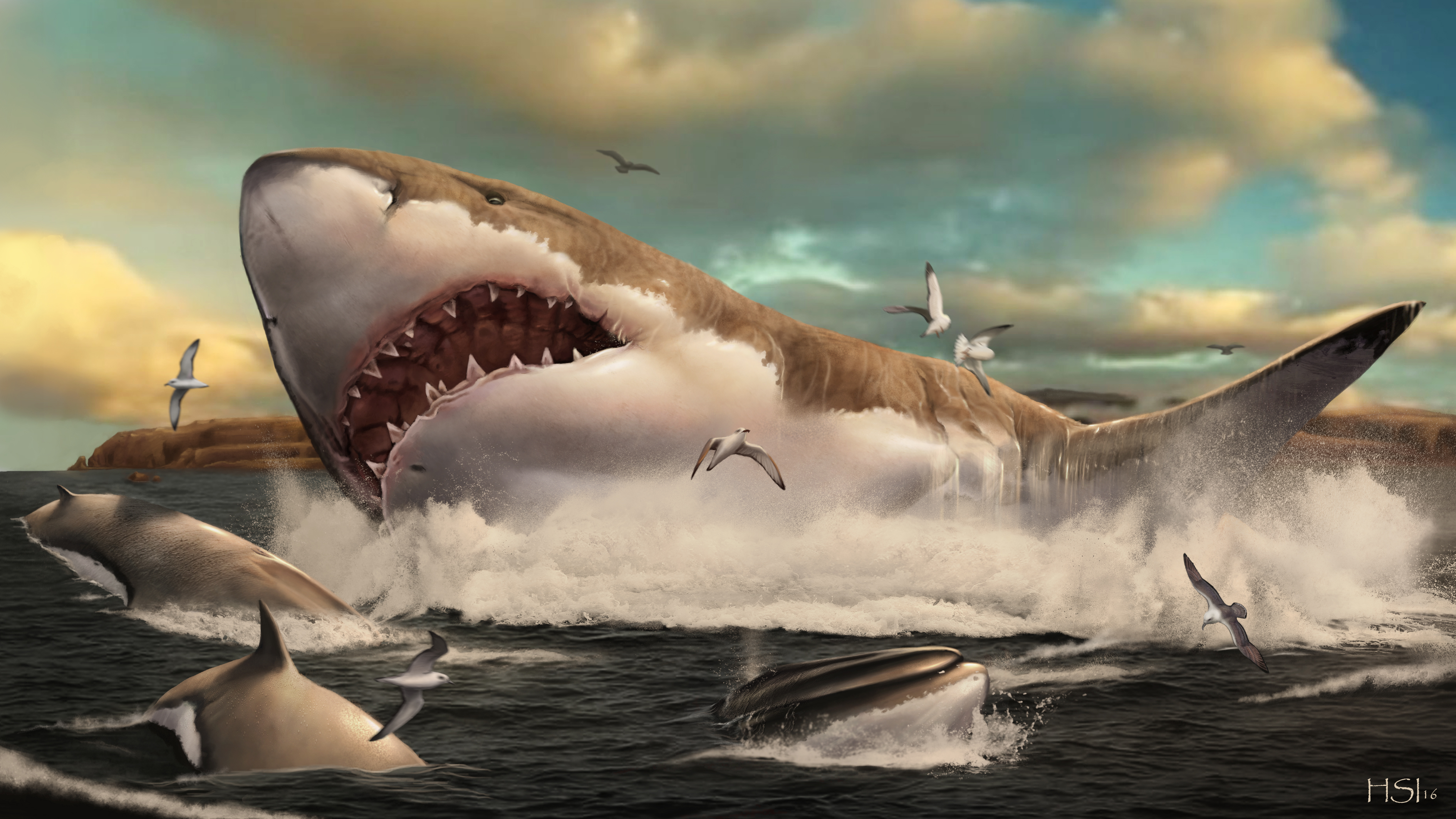
Restoration of Otodus megalodon along other marine fauna. This shark is an important component of the paleofauna of the Coquimbo Formation and similar units

The paleobiota of the Coquimbo Formation is extensively similar to those of the Bahía Inglesa and Pisco formations, also sharing similar depositional environments. Invertebrates such as molluscs are particularly abundant in the facies of the formation, represented by bivalves and gastropods, and to a lesser extent barnacles. Vertebrates are recurrent faunal components but are usually fragmentary in the record of the Coquimbo Formation, best represented by bird and cetacean remains. Like Bahía and Pisco, fish are well documented, including historically notorious taxa such as the megatoothed Otodus, the extant Carcharodon, and extinct Cosmopolitodus. The semiaquatic ground sloth Thalassocnus was otherwise only known from the Pisco Formation, but its fossil record is now reported from numerous geological units across Miocene-Pliocene deposits of South America including Argentina and Chile, specifically the Coquimbo Formation. During the Pliocene, the coasts of the Coquimbo Region served as nursery areas for Carcharodon carcharias, as evidenced in the high abundancy of juvenile teeth in multiple fossil localities belonging to the Coquimbo Formation.

Color key: Taxon / Reclassified taxon / Taxon falsely reported as present / Dubious taxon or junior synonym / Ichnotaxon / Ootaxon / Morphotaxon	Notes; Uncertain or tentative taxa are in small text; ~~crossed out~~ taxa are discredited.

=== Algae ===
==== Diatoms ====
Genus	Species	Locality	Material	Notes	Images
Actinocyclus	A. ellipticus	Quebrada Salinas	"Shell".	A hemidiscacean diatom.	
Actinocyclus	A. octonarius	Quebrada Salinas	"Shell".	A hemidiscacean diatom.	
Actinoptychus	A. senarius	Quebrada Salinas	"Shell".	A heliopeltacean diatom.	
Auliscus	A. caelatus	Quebrada Salinas	"Shell".	A triceratiacean diatom.	
Coscinodiscus	C. divisus	Quebrada Salinas	"Shell".	A coscinodiscacean diatom.	
Coscinodiscus	C. oculoiridis	Quebrada Salinas	"Shell".	A coscinodiscacean diatom.	
Diploneis	D. crabro	Quebrada Salinas	"Shell".	A diploneidacean diatom.	
Diploneis	D. pseudobombiformis	Quebrada Salinas	"Shell".	A diploneidacean diatom.	
Opephoropsis	O. tiltilensis	Quebrada Salinas	"Shell".	A bacillariophycean diatom.	
Grammatophora	G. angulosa	Quebrada Salinas	"Shell".	A grammatophoracean diatom.	
Navicula	N. lyra	Quebrada Salinas	"Shell".	A naviculacean diatom.	
Plagiogramma	P. obesum	Quebrada Salinas	"Shell".	A diatomacean diatom.	
Rhaphoneis	R. miocenica	Quebrada Salinas	"Shell".	A rhaphoneidacean diatom.	
Paralia	P. sulcata	Quebrada Salinas	"Shell".	A paraliacean diatom.	
Paralia	P. coronata	Quebrada Salinas	"Shell".	A paraliacean diatom.	

=== Dictyochales ===
Genus	Species	Locality	Material	Notes	Images
Mesocena	M. elliptica	Quebrada Salinas	"Shell".	A dictyochacean.	
Stephanocha	S. speculum	Quebrada Salinas	"Shell".	A dictyochacean. Initially reported as Distephanus.	

=== Dinoflagellates ===
Genus	Species	Locality	Material	Notes	Images
Actiniscus	A. pentasterias	Quebrada Salinas	"Shell".	An actiniscacean.	

=== Ebriids ===
Genus	Species	Locality	Material	Notes	Images
Ammodochium	A. rectangulare	Quebrada Salinas	"Shell".	An ammodochiacean.	
Ebriopsis	E. antiqua	Quebrada Salinas	"Shell".	A hermisinacean.	

=== Foraminiferans ===
Genus	Species	Locality	Material	Notes	Images
Ammonia	Indeterminate	Bahía de Guanaqueros	Not specified.	A benthonic foraminiferan.	
Buccella	Indeterminate	Bahía de Guanaqueros	Not specified.	A benthonic foraminiferan.	
Buccella	Indeterminate	Los Clarines	"Eight tests."	A benthonic foraminiferan.	
Buccella	B. peruviana	Los Clarines	"Numerous tests."	A benthonic foraminiferan.	
Buliminella	B. elegantissima	Bahía de Guanaqueros, Los Clarines	"Multiple tests."	A benthonic foraminiferan.	
Cibicides	Indeterminate	Los Clarines	"Three tests."	A benthonic foraminiferan.	
Cibicidoides	C. bradyi	Bahía de Guanaqueros	Not specified.	A benthonic foraminiferan.	
Cibicidoides	Indeterminate	Bahía de Guanaqueros	Not specified.	A benthonic foraminiferan.	
Florilus	F. grateloupi	El Rincón	Not specified.	A benthonic foraminiferan.	
Globigerina	G. bulloides	Bahía de Guanaqueros	Not specified.	A planktonic foraminiferan.	
Globigerina	G. falconensis	Bahía de Guanaqueros	Not specified.	A planktonic foraminiferan.	
Globigerinoides	G. sicanus	El Rincón	"Test".	A planktonic foraminiferan.	
Globobulimina	G. pacifica	Bahía de Guanaqueros	Not specified.	A benthonic foraminiferan.	
Globorotalia	Indeterminate	Bahía de Guanaqueros	Not specified.	A planktonic foraminiferan.	
Gyroidinoides	Indeterminate	Bahía de Guanaqueros	Not specified.	A benthonic foraminiferan.	
Hyalinea	Indeterminate	Bahía de Guanaqueros	Not specified.	A benthonic foraminiferan.	
Karreriella	K. bradyi	Bahía de Guanaqueros	Not specified.	A benthonic foraminiferan.	
Nonionella	Indeterminate	Bahía de Guanaqueros	Not specified.	A benthonic foraminiferan.	
Nonionella	Indeterminate	Los Clarines	"Multiple tests."	A benthonic foraminiferan.	
Nonionella	N. auris	Los Clarines	"Seven tests."	A benthonic foraminiferan.	
Orbulina	O. suturalis	El Rincón	"Test".	A planktonic foraminiferan.	
Praeorbulina	P. transitoria	El Rincón	"Test".	A planktonic foraminiferan.	
Protoglobobulimina	P. pupides	Bahía de Guanaqueros	Not specified.	A benthonic foraminiferan.	
Pseudononion	P. communis	Bahía de Guanaqueros	Not specified.	A benthonic foraminiferan.	
Quinqueloculina	Q. incisa	Bahía de Guanaqueros	Not specified.	A benthonic foraminiferan.	
Sigmomorphina	Indeterminate	Bahía de Guanaqueros	Not specified.	A benthonic foraminiferan.	
Triloculina	T. oblonga	Bahía de Guanaqueros	Not specified.	A benthonic foraminiferan.	
Uvigerina	Indeterminate	Bahía de Guanaqueros	Not specified.	A benthonic foraminiferan.	
Virgulinella	V. pertusa	El Rincón	"Tests".	A benthonic foraminiferan.	

=== Invertebrates ===
==== Barnacles ====
Genus	Species	Locality	Material	Notes	Images
cf. Austromegabalanus	A. psittacus	Lomas del Sauce	Not specified.	A balanid barnacle (the giant barnacle).	
Balanus	B. laevis	Not specified.	"Small shells."	A balanid barnacle.	
Balanus	Indeterminate	Bahía de Tongoy	"Partial shells and fragments."	A balanid barnacle.	
Tesseropora	T. chilensis	Tongoy, Monte Notable, Quebrada Salina-Quebrada Salinita	"Shells."	A tetraclitid acorn barnacle.	
Verruca	V. hermi	Tongoy, Monte Notable, Quebrada Salina-Quebrada Salinita	"Shells."	A verrucid acorn barnacle.	

==== Bivalves ====
Genus	Species	Locality	Material	Notes	Images
Acar	A. pusilla	Los Clarines	"Valves."	An arcid bivalve.	
Anadara	A. chilensis	Lomas del Sauce	"Valves."	An arcid bivalve.	
Anomia	Indeterminate	Lomas del Sauce	Not specified.	An anomiid bivalve.	
Anomia	A. peruvianus	Lomas del Sauce	"Internal mold."	An anomiid bivalve.	
Argopecten	A. purpuratus	Los Clarines	"Multiple valves."	A pectinid bivalve.	
Brachidontes	B. granulatus	Los Clarines	"Valves."	A mytilid bivalve.	
Brachidontes	Indeterminate	Los Clarines	"Valves."	A mytilid bivalve.	
Cardium?	Indeterminate	Lomas del Sauce	Not specified.	A cardiid bivalve.	
cf. "Chlamys"	"C." simpsoni	Lomas del Sauce	"Five specimens."	A pectinid bivalve.	
Chlamys	C. hupeanus	Bahía de Tongoy	"Partial and complete shells."	A pectinid bivalve.	
Chlamys	C. simpsoni	Lomas del Sauce	Not specified.	A pectinid bivalve.	
Chlamys	C. vidali	Tongoy, Monte Notable, Quebrada Salina-Quebrada Salinita	"Shells and valves."	A pectinid bivalve.	
Chlamys	Indeterminate	Bahía de Tongoy	"Shells."	A pectinid bivalve.	
Choromytilus	C. chorus	Los Clarines	"Shell and valves."	A mytilid bivalve.	
Crassostrea	C. transitoria	Quebrada Honda, Lomas del Sauce	"Valves."	An ostreid bivalve.	
Crassostrea	Indeterminate	Lomas del Sauce, Los Clarines	"Numerous valves."	An ostreid bivalve.	
Cucullaea?	Indeterminate	Lomas del Sauce	Not specified.	A cucullaeid bivalve.	
Cyclocardia	cf. C. compressa	Los Clarines	"Valves."	An carditid bivalve.	
Dietotenhosen	D. hupeanus	Coquimbo, Punta Teatinos, La Serena, Quebrada de Tongoy, Quebrada Romeral, Quebrada Lagunillas, Quebrada Honda	"Multiple right and left valves."	A pectinid bivalve.	
Dietotenhosen	D. remondi	Coquimbo, Estancia Tangue (Bahía de Tongoy), Punta Teatinos, Quebrada Herradura, Quebrada Honda	"Several right and left valves."	A pectinid bivalve.	
Ensis	E. macha	Lomas del Sauce, Los Clarines	"Partial internal molds and shells."	A pharid bivalve.	
Eurhomalea	E. cf. lenticularis	Los Clarines	"Multiple valves."	A venerid bivalve.	
Eurhomalea	Indeterminate	Lomas del Sauce	"Multiple valve."	A venerid bivalve.	
Leukoma	L. antiqua	Los Clarines	"Two valves."	A venerid bivalve.	
Leukoma	L. thaca	Los Clarines	"One valve."	A venerid bivalve.	
Leukoma	Indeterminate	Los Clarines	"One valve."	A venerid bivalve.	
cf. Mactra	Indeterminate	Lomas del Sauce	"Molds."	A mactrid bivalve.	
cf. Mactra	cf. M. auca	Lomas del Sauce	Not specified.	A mactrid bivalve.	
Mesodesma	M. donacium	Los Clarines	"Valves."	An mesodesmatid bivalve.	
Monia	M. alternans	Lomas del Sauce	"Seven specimens."	An anomiid bivalve.	
Mulinia	Indeterminate	Bahía Herradura, Bahía Coquimbo	"Shells."	A mactrid bivalve.	
Mulinia	Indeterminate	Los Clarines	"Single specimen."	A mactrid bivalve.	
Mulinia	M. edulis	Los Clarines	"Multiple valves."	A mactrid bivalve.	
Mulinia	cf. M. vidali	Bahía de Tongoy	"Thick shells."	A mactrid bivalve.	
cf. Nucula	Indeterminate	Lomas del Sauce	"Two specimens."	A nuculid bivalve.	
Ostrea	Indeterminate	Bahía de Tongoy	"Partial shells."	An ostreid bivalve.	
Panopea	P. coquimbensis	Lomas del Sauce	"Internal molds."	A hiatellid bivalve.	
Perumytilus	P. purpuratus	Los Clarines	"One valve."	A mytilid bivalve.	
Petricola	P. cf. rugosa	Los Clarines	"One valve."	A venerid bivalve.	
Pododesmus	P. alternans	Lomas del Sauce	Not specified.	An anomiid bivalve.	
Protothaca	Indeterminate	Bahía Herradura, Bahía Coquimbo	"Shells."	A venerid bivalve.	
Retrotapes	R. exalbidus	Coquimbo	"Shells and valves."	A venerid bivalve.	
Retrotapes	R. lenticularis	Guayacán, Tongoy, Quebrada Chañaral	"Valves and hinges."	A venerid bivalve.	
Retrotapes	cf. R. cleryanus	Lomas del Sauce	Not specified.	A venerid bivalve.	
Retrotapes	cf. R. eunippe	Lomas del Sauce	Not specified.	A venerid bivalve.	
Retrotapes	Indeterminate	Lomas del Sauce	Not specified.	A venerid bivalve.	
Semele	S. solida	Los Clarines	"Single valve."	A semelid bivalve.	
Semele	Indeterminate	Los Clarines	"Single specimen."	A semelid bivalve.	
Solen	Indeterminate	Lomas del Sauce	Not specified.	A solenid bivalve.	
Tagelus	T. dombeii	Lomas del Sauce	"Valves and molds."	A solecurtid bivalve.	
cf. Tellina	Indeterminate	Lomas del Sauce	"Multiple specimens with shells and molds."	A tellinid bivalve.	
Trachycardium	T. procerum	Lomas del Sauce, Los Clarines	"Molds."	A tellinid bivalve.	
Zygochlamys	Indeterminate	Lomas del Sauce	"One specimen."	A pectinid bivalve.	
Zygochlamys	cf. Z. coquimbensis	Los Clarines	"Valves."	A pectinid bivalve.	
Zygochlamys	cf. Z. hupeanus	Lomas del Sauce	"Valves."	A pectinid bivalve.	
Zygochlamys	cf. Z. vidali	Lomas del Sauce, Los Clarines	"Valves."	A pectinid bivalve.	
Zygochlamys	cf. Z. simpsoni	Quebrada Honda	"Shell."	A pectinid bivalve.	

==== Brachiopods ====
Genus	Species	Locality	Material	Notes	Images
Brachiopoda indet.	Indeterminate	Quebrada Honda	"Fragmented shells."	A brachiopod.	
Magellania	M. macrostoma	Lomas del Sauce	Not specified.	A terebratellid brachiopod.	

==== Decapods ====
Genus	Species	Locality	Material	Notes	Images
Decapoda indet.	Indeterminate	Bahía de Guanaqueros	"Chelae."	A decapod.	

==== Gastropods ====
Genus	Species	Locality	Material	Notes	Images
Acanthina	A. unicornis	Bahía de Tongoy, Lomas del Sauce, Los Clarines	"Shells."	A muricid gastropod.	
Acanthina	A. monodon	Lomas del Sauce	Not specified.	A muricid gastropod.	
Acanthina	cf. A. katzi	Quebrada El Culebrón	"Shell."	A muricid gastropod.	
Aeneator?	A. cleryanus	Lomas del Sauce	"Multiple shells with internal molds."	A buccinid gastropod.	
Chlorostoma	C. cf. atrum	Los Clarines	"Partial shells."	A tegulid gastropod.	
Chorus	C. blainvillei	Quebrada El Culebrón, Lomas del Sauce, Los Clarines	"Multiple shells."	A muricid gastropod.	
Chorus	C. cf. covacevichi	Los Clarines	"Two shells."	A muricid gastropod.	
Chorus	C. dorialis	Quebrada El Culebrón, Lomas del Sauce	"Shells."	A muricid gastropod.	
Chorus	C. grandis	Lomas del Sauce	"Five shells."	A muricid gastropod.	
Chorus	C. giganteus	Los Clarines	"Fifteen shells."	A muricid gastropod.	
Chorus	Indeterminate	Bahía de Tongoy, Lomas del Sauce, Los Clarines	"Partial and complete shells."	A muricid gastropod.	
cf. Cirsotrema	C. magellanicum	Los Clarines	"Two shells."	A turritellid gastropod.	
Concholepas	C. concholepas	Los Clarines	"Three shells."	A muricid gastropod.	
Crassilabrum	C. crassilabrum	Los Clarines	"Eight shells."	A muricid gastropod.	
Crepidula	Indeterminate	Bahía de Tongoy	"Shell fragments."	A calyptraeid gastropod.	
Crepipatella	C. dilata	Los Clarines	"Multiple shells."	A calyptraeird gastropod.	
Felicioliva	F. peruviana	Lomas del Sauce	"Multiple shells and internal molds."	An olivid gastropod.	
Fissurella	Indeterminate	Los Clarines	"Two shells."	A fissurellid gastropod.	
Fusinus	cf. F. remondi	Quebrada El Culebrón	"Shell."	A fasciolariid gastropod.	
Herminespina	H. mirabilis	Los Clarines	"One shell."	A muricid gastropod.	
Herminespina	H. philippii	Los Clarines	"Twelve shells."	A muricid gastropod.	
Incatella	Indeterminate	Lomas del Sauce	"Shells."	A turritellid gastropod.	
Incatella	I. cingulata	Los Clarines	"Five shells."	A turritellid gastropod.	
Incatella	I. cingulatiformis	Los Clarines	"Fifteen shells."	A turritellid gastropod.	
Nassarius	Indeterminate	Los Clarines	"Three shells."	A buccinid gastropod.	
cf. Neverita	Indeterminate	Lomas del Sauce	"Partial internal mold."	A naticid gastropod.	
Oliva	O. peruviana	Lomas del Sauce	Not specified.	An olivid gastropod.	
Oliva	Indeterminate	Lomas del Sauce	Not specified.	An olivid gastropod.	
Prisogaster	P. niger	Lomas del Sauce, Los Clarines	"Several shells."	A turbinid gastropod.	
Rissoina	R. inca	Los Clarines	"Two shells."	A naticid gastropod.	
Trochita	T. trochiformis	Lomas del Sauce, Los Clarines	"Multiple shells."	A calyptraeird gastropod.	
Trochita	Indeterminate	Los Clarines	A calyptraeird gastropod.		
Turritella	T. leptogramma	Bahía de Tongoy	"Shells and coquinas."	A turritellid gastropod.	
Turritella	Indeterminate	Bahía de Tongoy	"Shells."	A turritellid gastropod.	
Xanthochorus	cf. X. cassidiformis	Quebrada El Culebrón	"Single shell."	A muricid gastropod.	

==== Invertebrate traces ====
Genus	Species	Locality	Material	Notes	Images
Macaronichnus	M. segregatus	Bahía de Tongoy	"Small and sinuous burrows."	Invertebrate trace fossil.	
Ophiomorpha	Indeterminate	Bahía de Tongoy	"Burrows."	Invertebrate trace fossil.	
Skolithos	Indeterminate	Bahía de Tongoy	"Burrows."	Invertebrate trace fossil.	
Thalassinoides	Indeterminate	Bahía de Tongoy	"Burrows."	Invertebrate trace fossil.	

==== Ostracods ====
Genus	Species	Locality	Material	Notes	Images
Ostracoda indet.	Indeterminate	Bahía de Guanaqueros	Not specified.	An ostracod.	

=== Vertebrates ===
==== Birds ====
Genus	Species	Locality	Material	Notes	Images
Diomedeidae indet.	Indeterminate	Chañaral de Aceituno	"Partial right tarsometatarsus."	An albatross.	
Eudyptes?	Indeterminate	Lomas del Sauce	Not specified.	A penguin.	
cf. Palaeospheniscus	Indeterminate	La Cantera	"Partial right humerus."	A penguin.	
Phalacrocorax	Indeterminate	Lomas del Sauce	"Fragmentary left femur".	A cormorant.	
Spheniscidae indet.	Indeterminate	La Cantera	"Synsacrum fragment."	A penguin.	
Spheniscus	Indeterminate	Bahía de Carrizalillo, Chañaral de Aceituno	Not specified.	A penguin.	

==== Cetaceans ====
Genus	Species	Locality	Material	Notes	Images
Balaenopteridae indet.	Indeterminate	Lomas del Sauce	"Two partial skeletons and a single skull."	A baleen whale.	
Balaenopteridae indet.	Indeterminate	Bahía de Carrizalillo	"Isolated and sometimes articulated remains."	A baleen whale.	
Balaenidae indet.	Indeterminate	Parque El Culebrón	"Two partial skeletons with skulls."	A baleen whale. Formerly interpreted as balaenopterid whale remains. Reported material was not collected.	
Cetacea indet.	Indeterminate	Puerto de Coquimbo	"Four dorsal vertebrae."	A whale.	
Cetotheriidae indet.	Indeterminate	Quebrada Carrizalillo	"Single basicranium."	A baleen whale.	
Cetotheriidae indet.	Indeterminate	Bahía de Carrizalillo	"Isolated and sometimes articulated remains."	A baleen whale.	
Cetotheriidae indet.	Indeterminate	Not specified.	Not specified.	A baleen whale.	
Plesiobalaenoptera	P. hubachi	Bahía Herradura de Guayacán	"Nearly complete skeleton."	A baleen whale. Formation of origin not stated, but it is likely the Coquimbo Formation. Previously known as "Megaptera", the species is not related to Megaptera, and is now assigned to Plesiobalaenoptera.	
Pliopontos	Indeterminate	Bahía Herradura	"Partial vertebral column and ribs."	A toothed whale.	
Squalodon?	Indeterminate	La Herradura	"Vertebrae and ribs."	A toothed whale. Formerly interpreted as Delphinus sp.	

==== Fish ====
===== Bony fish =====
Genus	Species	Locality	Material	Notes	Images
Carangidae indet.	Indeterminate	Bahía de Carrizalillo	"Mostly vertebrae."	A carangid fish.	
Elasmobranchii indet.	Indeterminate	Bahía de Guanaqueros	"Teeth."	An elasmobranch fish.	
Sparus	cf. S. aurata	Lomas del Sauce	Not specified.	A sea bream fish (the gilt-head bream).	
Teleostei indet.	Indeterminate	Bahía de Guanaqueros	"Teeth."	A teleost fish.	
Thunnus	Indeterminate	El Rincón	"Single caudal vertebra."	A scombrid fish.	

==== Eels ====
Genus	Species	Locality	Material	Notes	Images
Genypterus	Indeterminate	Bahía de Carrizalillo	Not specified.	An ophidiid eel.	

===== Rays =====
Genus	Species	Locality	Material	Notes	Images
Aetobatus	Indeterminate	El Rincón	"Lower dental plate."	A myliobatid ray.	
Aetomylaeus	Indeterminate	Quebrada Honda	"Dental plates."	A myliobatid ray.	
Dasyatis	Indeterminate	Lomas del Sauce	"Ten teeth."	A dasyatid ray.	
Dipturus	Indeterminate	Bahía de Carrizalillo	Not specified.	A rajid ray.	
Myliobatis	Indeterminate	La Cantera Baja, Lomas del Sauce	"Six teeth."	A myliobatid ray.	

===== Sharks =====
Genus	Species	Locality	Material	Notes	Images
Carcharhinus	Indeterminate	La Cantera Baja, La Cantera	"Three teeth."	A carcharhinid shark.	
Carcharodon	C. carcharias	Bahía de Tongoy, Bahía de Carrizalillo, Caleta Chañaral, La Cantera Baja, La Herradura, Lomas del Sauce, Quebrada Camarones, Quebrada El Culebrón, Quebrada Las Rosas.	"Multiple teeth."	A large lamnid shark (the great white shark).	
Carcharodon	C. plicatilis	El Rincón	"Upper lateral tooth."	A lamnid shark.	
aff. Centroselachus	Indeterminate	Bahía de Carrizalillo	Not specified.	A somniosid shark.	
Cetorhinus	C. maximus	El Rincón	"Single tooth."	A cetorhinid shark (the basking shark).	
Cetorhinus	Indeterminate	Bahía de Carrizalillo	Not specified.	A cetorhinid shark.	
Cosmopolitodus	C. hastalis	Bahía de Tongoy, Bahía de Carrizalillo, El Rincón	"Teeth."	A lamnid shark. Reported as Isurus hastalis.	
Galeorhinus	G. galeus	Lomas del Sauce	Not specified.	A triakid shark (the school shark).	
Galeorhinus	Indeterminate	Bahía de Carrizalillo	Not specified.	A triakid shark.	
Heterodontus	ex. gr. H. francisci	Lomas del Sauce	Not specified.	A heterodontid shark.	
Heterodontus	H. francisci?	Lomas del Sauce, Los Clarines, Quebrada Camarones	"Numerous teeth."	A heterodontid shark (the horn shark).	
Hexanchus	cf. H. griseus	La Cantera Baja, Lomas del Sauce, Quebrada el Culebrón, Quebrada Las Rosas	"Six teeth."	A hexanchid shark (the bluntnose sixgill shark).	
Hexanchus	Indeterminate	Bahía de Carrizalillo	Not specified.	A hexanchid shark.	
Isurus	cf. I. oxyrinchus	Caleta Chañaral, Caleta Los Hornos, La Herradura	"Four teeth."	A lamnid shark.	
Isurus	I. oxyrinchus	Lomas del Sauce, El Rincón	"Teeth."	A lamnid shark (shortfin mako).	
Lamniformes indet.	Indeterminate	Lomas del Sauce	Not specified.	A mackerel shark.	
Odontaspis	O. ferox	La Cantera Baja	"Lateral tooth."	An odontaspidid shark.	
Otodus	O. megalodon	Punta de Choros, Quebrada El Culebrón, Quebrada Chañaral de Aceitunas	"Four teeth."	A giant otodontid shark (the megalodon). Formerly identified as Carcharocles.	
Prionace	P. glauca	Bahía de Carrizalillo	Not specified.	A carcharhinid shark (the blue shark).	
Pristiophorus	Indeterminate.	Bahía de Carrizalillo, La Cantera Baja, La Herradura, Lomas del Sauce, Quebrada Las Rosas	"Several teeth."	A sawshark.	
Squalus	Indeterminate	Bahía de Carrizalillo	Not specified.	A squalid shark.	
Squatina	Indeterminate	Lomas del Sauce	"Six teeth."	A hexanchid shark.	

==== Seals ====
Genus	Species	Locality	Material	Notes	Images
Otariidae indet.	Indeterminate	Bahía de Carrizalillo	"Right dentary."	An otariid seal.	

==== Sloths ====
Genus	Species	Locality	Material	Notes	Images
Thalassocnus	T. carolomartini	Lomas del Sauce	"Partial postcranial skeleton lacking skull."	A nothrotheriid ground sloth.	
Thalassocnus	Indeterminate	Bahía de Carrizalillo	"Isolated remains."	A nothrotheriid ground sloth.	

== See also ==
- Calvert Formation
- Dos Bocas Formation
- Gaiman Formation
- Purisima Formation
