= 2019 in ichnology =

This article records new taxa of trace fossils of every kind that were scheduled to be described during the year 2019, as well as other significant discoveries and events related to trace fossil paleontology that were scheduled to occur in 2019.

== Research ==
- Ivantsov, Nagovitsyn & Zakrevskaya (2019) describe traces of macroorganisms associated with the body imprints of trace-producers from Ediacaran deposits of the southeastern White Sea region (Russia).
- Xiao et al. (2019) describe a new trace fossil from the Ediacaran Dengying Formation (China), interpreted as produced by a bilaterian animal exploring an oxygen oasis in microbial mats, and name a new ichnotaxon Yichnus levis.
- A study on the ichnotaxon Macaronichnus segregatis degiberti described on the basis of fossil burrows likely formed through selective sand feeding and excretion of polychaetes, aiming to reconstruct tracemaker behaviour, is published by Nara & Seike (2019).
- A study on the horseshoe crab traces from the Carboniferous Steven C. Minkin Fossil Site (Alabama, United States) is published by King, Stimson & Lucas, who name new ichnospecies Kouphichnium atkinsoni and K. minkinensis.
- Horseshoe crab traces from the Middle Jurassic strata of the Imilchil area (Central High Atlas, Morocco), indicating the presence of horseshoe crabs at the southern margin of the Tethys Ocean, are described by Oukassou et al. (2019).
- Tracks of giant millipede-like arthropods, assigned to the ichnotaxon Diplichnites cuithensis and likely produced by members of the genus Arthropleura, are described from the Carboniferous (late Pennsylvanian) of the Graissessac Basin (southern France) by Moreau et al. (2019).
- Tracks produced by an edopoid temnospondyl are described from the Carboniferous (Viséan) Alston Formation (North Yorkshire, United Kingdom) by Bird et al. (2019), representing the stratigraphically oldest known tetrapod trackway from the United Kingdom reported so far and the oldest known record of Edopoidea.
- First tetrapod tracks from the Permian of Sardinia (Italy), assigned to the ichnogenus Merifontichnus and representing the oldest occurrence of the ichnogenus to date, are described by Citton et al. (2019).
- A study on the taphonomy of Permian (Cisuralian) tetrapod tracks from the Coconino and De Chelly formations of Arizona, and on the locomotion and phylogenetic relationships of the trackmakers, is published by Marchetti et al. (2019).
- Tetrapod tracks assigned to the ichnogenus Ichniotherium are reported from the eolian Coconino Sandstone by Francischini et al. (2019), who interpret these tracks as the oldest known evidence of occupation of deserts by non-amniote tetrapods (probably diadectomorphs.
- A revision of Lopingian tetrapod tracks from eolian paleoenvironments of Germany and Scotland is published by Marchetti, Voigt & Lucas (2019), who reject the interpretation of these tracks as monospecific associations of synapsid footprints, reporting them to be more diverse, and interpret them as evidence indicating that faunal turnover related to end-Guadalupian extinction event occurred not only at high-mid paleolatitudes, but also at low paleolatitudes of Pangaea.
- A revision of tetrapod tracks from the Upper Permian Val Gardena Formation of the Dolomites region in northern Italy is published by Marchetti, Voigt & Klein (2019), who name new ichnogenus Dolomitipes.
- A revision of tetrapod tracks from Permian-Early Triassic tracksites in the main Karoo Basin of South Africa is published by Marchetti et al. (2019), who name new ichnotaxon Karoopes gansfonteinensis.
- Tetrapod footprints, mostly quadruped trackways of large footprints most likely produced by kannemeyeriiform dicynodonts, are described from the Middle Triassic Cerro de las Cabras Formation (Argentina) by Lagnaoui et al. (2019), who name a new ichnotaxon Pentasauropus argentinae.
- The oldest frog tracks reported from the fossil record are described from the Lower Cretaceous (Aptian-Albian) Jinju Formation (South Korea) by Kim et al. (2019).
- A new assemblage of lizard tracks, representing the largest such assemblage yet reported from the Cretaceous, is described from the Lower Cretaceous Jinju Formation (South Korea) by Kim et al. (2019), who name a new ichnotaxon Neosauroides innovatus.
- Trackways of sea turtle hatchlings are described from the Pleistocene of South Africa by Lockley et al. (2019), who name new ichnotaxa Australochelichnus agulhasii and Marinerichnus latus.
- Complete step cycles produced by archosaurs, assigned to the ichnogenus Brachychirotherium, are described from the Upper Triassic Machraa Abbass Member of the Oued Oum Er Rbiaa Formation (Morocco) by Hminna et al. (2019), representing the first complete trackway of this ichnogenus in North Africa.
- A study on tracks assigned to the ichnogenus Chirotherium from the Middle Triassic Guanling Formation (Yunnan, China), produced by members of Archosauriformes, is published online by Xing & Klein (2019), who also describe the first tracks and trackways of the ichnogenus Rhynchosauroides from the Asian continent.
- Five invertebrate traces including a new ichnospecies of Diplichnites (Diplichnites rawi), were described from the latest Carboniferous of Shropshire, England by Hedge et al. (2019)
- Tetrapod burrow most likely produced by a notosuchian crocodylomorph is described from the Upper Cretaceous Bauru Group (Brazil) by Martinelli et al. (2019).
- Crocodyliform tracks, probably produced under water by a bottom walking and punting animal, are described from the Upper Cretaceous (?Cenomanian-Santonian) Bayan Shireh Formation (Mongolia) by Lee et al. (2019).
- Costa-Pérez, Moratalla & Marugán-Lobón (2019) evaluate the utility of geometric morphometrics for determining the degree to which size, speed and taxonomy are contributing factors to the difference of bipedal dinosaur trackways.
- New Middle Jurassic tracksite dominated by non-avian theropod footprints, including theropod trackways with preserved manus tracks, is reported from the Wangjiashan Formation (Gansu, China) by Li et al. (2019), who name a new ichnotaxon Grallator pingchuanensis.
- A study comparing Late Jurassic tracks of large theropods from Europe and North Africa is published by Belvedere et al. (2019).
- A diverse assemblage of dinosaur footprints is described from the Lower Cretaceous (Berriasian-Valanginian) Ashdown Formation of East Sussex, southern England by Shillito & Davies (2019).
- Theropod footprints with anatomical features which don't match any known Gondwanan theropod with preserved pedal bones are described from the Albian Lagarcito Formation (Argentina) by Melchor et al. (2019), who name a new ichnotaxon Picunichnus quijadaensis Melchor.
- A study on the ichnotaxonomy of theropod footprints from the Lower Cretaceous Kitadani Formation (Japan) is published by Tsukiji et al. (2019).
- Small theropod footprints representing the ichnogenus Minisauripus, preserving high-definition skin traces, are described from the Lower Cretaceous Jinju Formation (South Korea) by Kim et al. (2019).
- A study on putative theropod footprints assigned to the ichnogenus Eubrontes is published by Weems (2019), who argues that bipedal sauropodomorphs were more likely trackmakers of these tracks.
- A study on sauropod tracks from the Jurassic Tafaytour tracksites (Argana Basin, Morocco), and on their implications for inferring forelimb posture in sauropod dinosaurs, is published by Lallensack et al. (2019).
- A study on sauropod tracks from a new dinosaur tracksite from the Middle Jurassic Isli Formation (Morocco), providing evidence of presence of basal eusauropods in the Middle Jurassic-Early Cretaceous interval in the northwestern part of Gondwana, is published by Oukassou et al. (2019).
- A study on sauropod tracks from the Upper Jurassic Tianchihe Formation at the Guanxi site (Shanxi, China) is published online by Xing et al. (2019).
- An assemblage of sauropod tracks with a considerable size range, likely produced by an association of sauropods of different size-classes, is described from the Cretaceous Hengshan Formation (Zhejiang, China) by Xing et al. (2019).
- New sauropod trackway, representing the first record of a narrow-gauge sauropod trackway from the Cenomanian reported so far, will be described from the Candeleros Formation (Argentina) by Heredia et al. (2019).
- Large ornithischian (probably thyreophoran) tracks are described from the Middle Jurassic Chuanjie Formation (China) by Xing et al. (2019).
- Probable track of a thyreophoran dinosaur, possibly produced by Isaberrysaura, is described from the Middle Jurassic Lajas Formation (Argentina) by Pablo et al. (2019).
- Ordovician arthropod trackways in the Borrowdale Volcanic Group were shown to be more likely to be death traces than evidence for early life on land by Shillito and Davies (2019). ,
- A study on non-avian dinosaur and bird tracks (representing some of the oldest known bird tracks) preserved in slabs used as building stones at the Chengde Mountain Resort, originating from the Tuchengzi Formation (China) and dating to the Jurassic-Cretaceous boundary, is published online by Xing et al. (2019).
- Description of non-avian dinosaur and bird tracks from the Upper Cretaceous Chignik Formation (southwestern Alaska), evaluating their implications for the knowledge of habitat preferences of northern high-latitude dinosaurs, is published by Fiorillo et al. (2019).
- A study on bird footprints from the Maastrichtian–Danian Yacoraite Formation (Argentina) is published by de Valais & Cónsole-Gonella (2019).
- Flamingo-like and anatid-like fossil bird footprints are described from the Vinchina Formation (Argentina) by Farina et al. (2019), who name new ichnotaxa Phoenicopterichnum lucioi and P. vinchinaensis.
- Pterosaur tracks, larger than most other pterosaurian ichnites of the Late Jurassic age, are described from the Kimmeridgian carbonate deposits exposed in Wierzbica Quarry (Poland) by Elgh, Pieńkowski & Niedźwiedzki (2019).
- Evidence from coprolites, isolated worn teeth, fossil regurgitates and crushed or bite-marked dicynodont bones, indicating that Triassic archosaur Smok wawelski was at least an occasional osteophage consuming bones in a manner comparable to tyrannosaurid theropod dinosaurs, is presented by Qvarnström, Ahlberg & Niedźwiedzki (2019).
- A new late Pleistocene site containing bones and footprints of mammals is reported from Brazil by Oliveira et al. (2019).
- Large carnivore footprints, probably produced by Smilodon populator, will be described from a new ichnological site from the Late Pleistocene of Buenos Aires Province (Argentina) by Agnolin et al. (2019), who name a new ichnotaxon Felipeda miramarensis.
- A study on hominin footprints discovered near Ileret (Kenya) and on their implications for the knowledge of sexual dimorphism in Homo erectus is published by Villmoare, Hatala & Jungers (2019).
- A study on human footprints, handprints and other traces from the Upper Paleolithic of the Bàsura Cave (Italy), and on their implications for the knowledge of the behavior and social structure of the human group inhabiting this cave, is published by Romano et al. (2019).
- Trace fossils assigned to the ichnogenus Protopaleodictyon, of large size compared to other ichnospecies of this ichnogenus, are described from the Cambrian Stephen–Eldon formation transition (Alberta, Canada) by Morgan, Henderson & Pratt (2019), who name a new ichnospecies Protopaleodictyon aitkeni.
- A study on trace fossils from the Lower Triassic Dongchuan, Feixianguan and Jialingjiang formations (China), and on their implications for inferring how the Permian–Triassic extinction event affected the brackish-water ecosystem and how this ecosystem recovered in the Early Triassic, is published by Zhang et al. (2019).
- A study on trace fossils from the early Middle Triassic Luoping Biota (Yunnan Province, South China), and on their implications for inferring the timing of recovery of marine ecosystems after Permian–Triassic extinction event, is published by Luo et al. (2019).
- Paleodictyon trace fossils are reported from the Upper Triassic Bagong Formation (China) by Zhan, Peng & Chen (2019).
