= Grammatophora =

Grammatophora may refer to:

- Grammatophora (alga), genus of algae
- Grammatophora, genus of moths, synonym of Speranza
