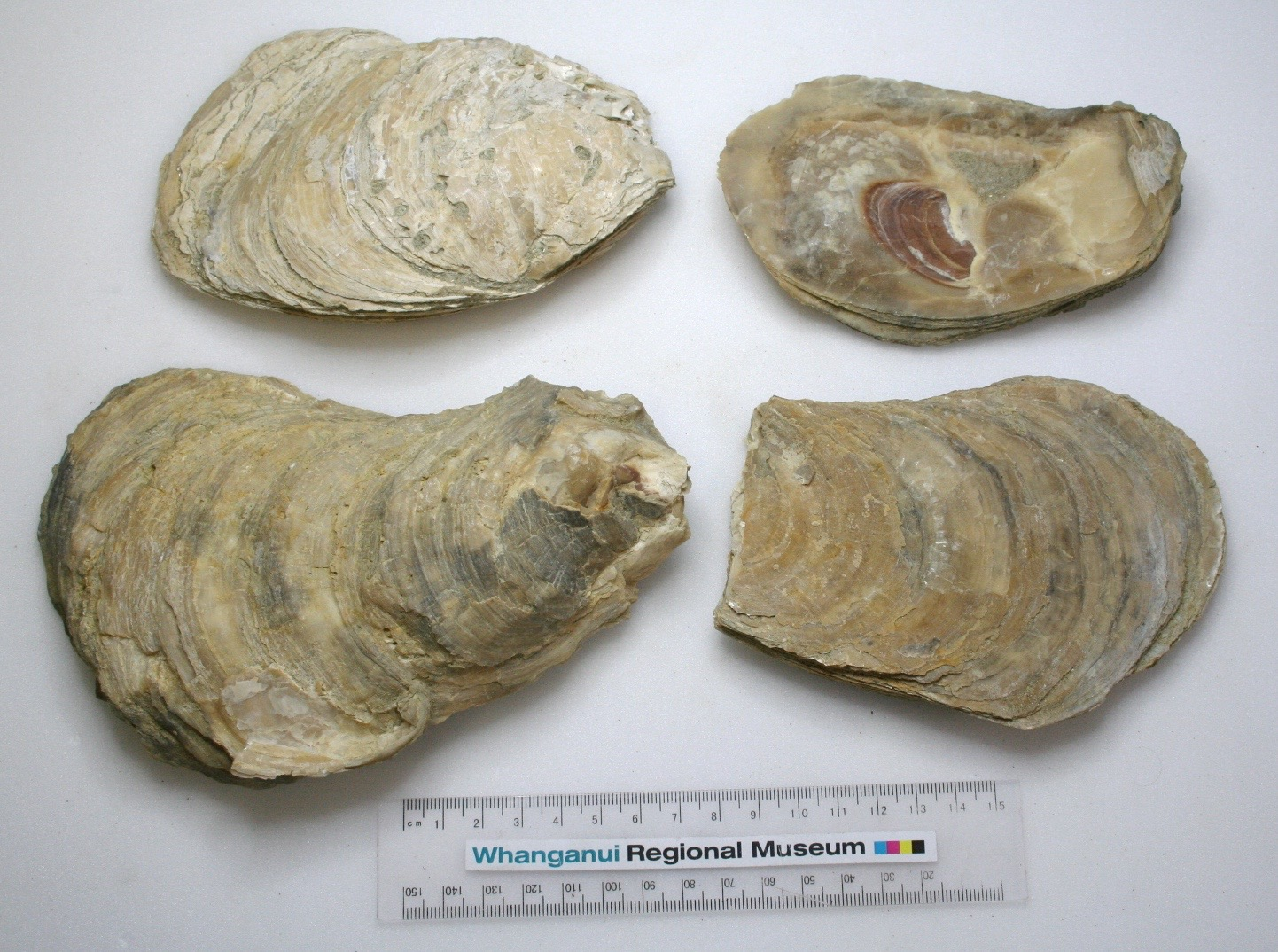
- from Wilkies Shellbed, 2.5 mya.

Conservation status
- Extinct

Scientific classification
- Kingdom: Animalia
- Phylum: Mollusca
- Class: Bivalvia
- Order: Ostreida
- Family: Ostreidae
- Genus: Crassostrea
- Species: †C. ingens

Binomial name
- †Crassostrea ingens Zittel, 1864

= Crassostrea ingens =

Crassostrea ingens Temporal range: Miocene – Pliocene

Species of bivalve

Crassostrea ingens is a species of fossil oyster, a marine bivalve mollusk in the family Ostreidae, the oyster. This species lived during the Pliocene. Fossils have been found in New Zealand shallow-water limestone and shellbeds. Locations include the Wairarapa, Whanganui basin, Gisborne district, North Canterbury, and Hawke's Bay (especially in the Te Aute limestone).

== Description ==
Crassostrea ingens is a giant fossil oyster. It has a shell reaching a height of 200 millimetres (7.9 in) to over 300 millimetres (12 in). This shell is biconvex. The left valve is thick and deep, with inflation of 60 millimetres (2.4 in) to over 80 millimetres (3.1 in); interior cavity depth 30 millimetres (1.2 in) to over 40 millimetres (1.6 in). The right valve is almost flat, 15 millimetres (0.59 in) to 40 millimetres (1.6 in) thick. Most specimens curve slightly to the left. The adductor scar area in most Pliocene specimens retains a purplish red colour. Beu and Raine (2009) note that: "This is the sole giant oyster in New Zealand Late Miocene–Pliocene rocks, and there has never been any confusion over the identity of C. ingens."
