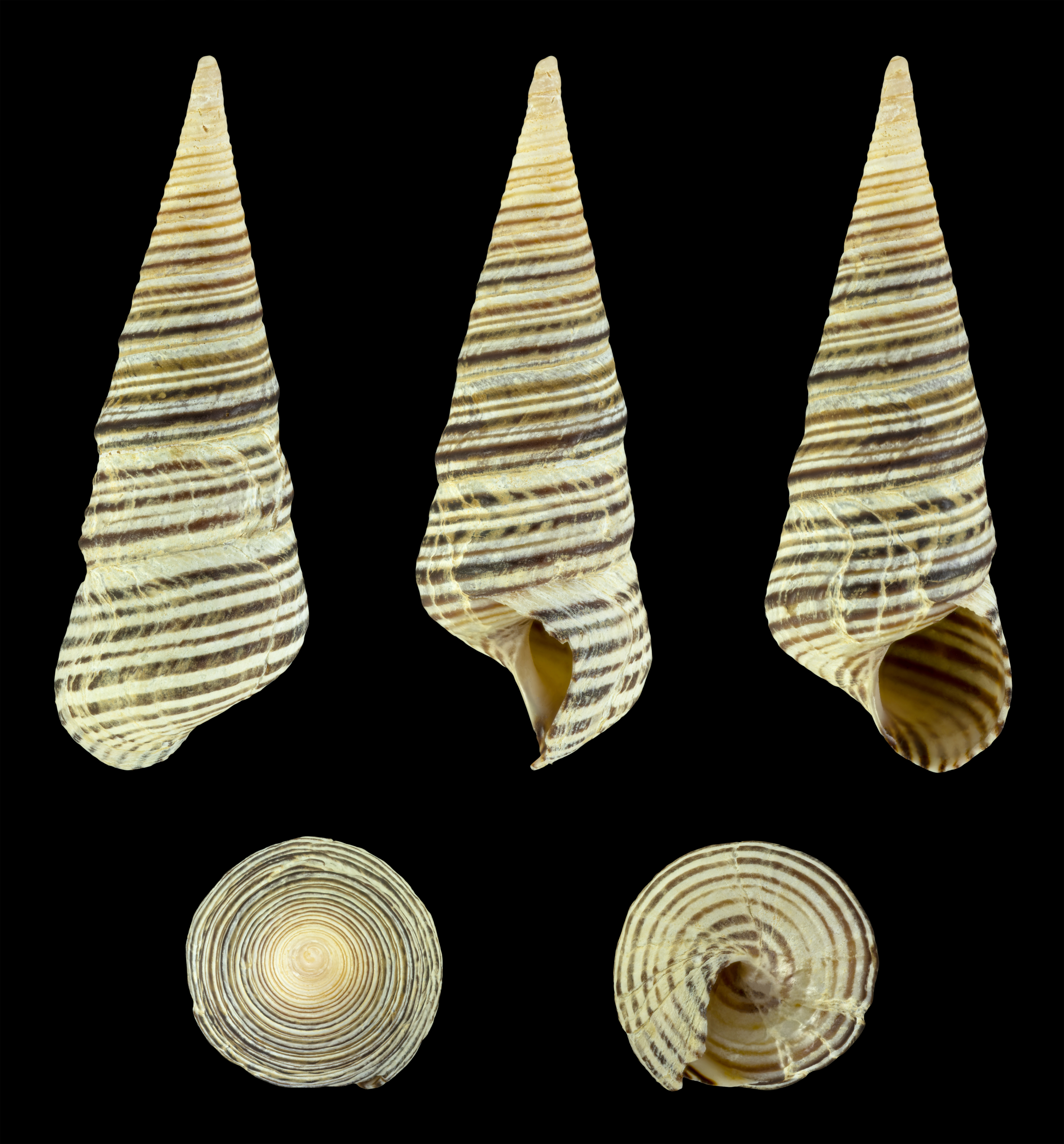
- Incatella cingulata

Scientific classification
- Kingdom: Animalia
- Phylum: Mollusca
- Class: Gastropoda
- Subclass: Caenogastropoda
- Order: incertae sedis
- Family: Turritellidae
- Genus: Incatella
- Species: I. cingulata

Binomial name
- Incatella cingulata (Sowerby I, 1825)

Synonyms
- Turritella (Haustator) cingulata G. B. Sowerby I, 1825 (Alternate representation); Turritella cingulata G.B. Sowerby I, 1825; Turritella extricarinata Sacco, 1895 (Synonym - unnecessary replacement name pro Turritella tricarinata King, 1832); Turritella tricarinata P. P. King, 1832

= Incatella cingulata =

Species of gastropod

Incatella cingulata is a species of sea snail, a marine gastropod mollusk in the family Turritellidae.
