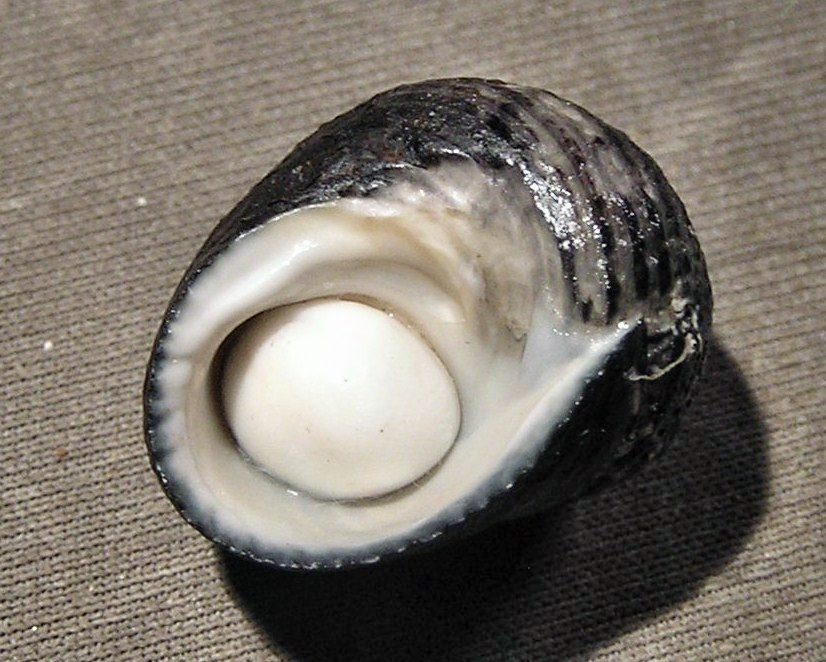
- Apertural view of a shell of Prisogaster niger

Scientific classification
- Kingdom: Animalia
- Phylum: Mollusca
- Class: Gastropoda
- Subclass: Vetigastropoda
- Order: Trochida
- Family: Turbinidae
- Genus: Prisogaster
- Species: P. niger

Binomial name
- Prisogaster niger (Wood, 1828)

Synonyms
- Amyxa nigra Troschel, 1852; Prisogaster nigra (Wood, 1828); Turbo niger W. Wood, 1828

= Prisogaster niger =

Species of gastropod

Prisogaster niger is a species of sea snail, a marine gastropod mollusk in the family Turbinidae, the turban snails.

== Description ==
"The size of the shell varies between 10 mm and 35 mm. The very solid, imperforate shell has an ovate shape.Its color pattern is deep dull purplish or bluish black. The short spire is convex and blunt. The 5-6 whorls are somewhat flattened below the sutures, with a superficial spiral line, and marked with light incremental striae. The large apertureis very oblique, ovate, silvery inside and rounded below. The outer lip is slightly fluted within. The white columella is wide and beas on its face a longitudinal rib which rises in the region of the umbilicus. The parietal wall is eroded, white, smooth, or with three white transverse rugae.

The oval operculum is concave within, buff, with 2-3 very rapidly increasing whorls. The nucleus measures one-fourth the distance across the face from the basal margin. The outer surface is white, very convex and obsoletely rugose."

== Distribution ==
This species occurs in the Pacific Ocean from Peru to the Strait of Magellan.
