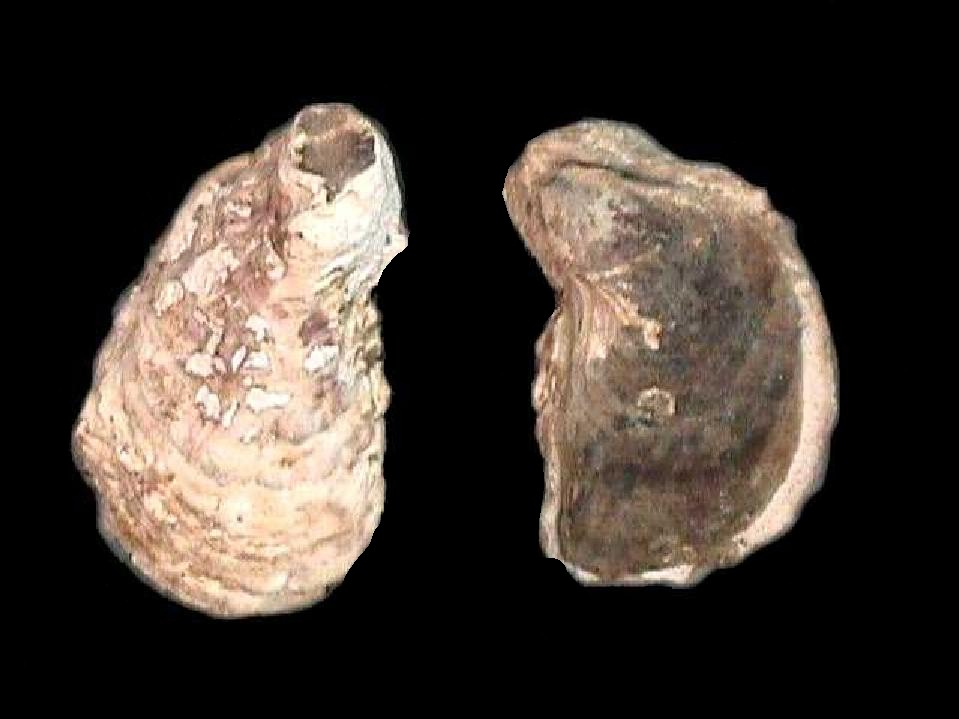

Scientific classification
- Kingdom: Animalia
- Phylum: Mollusca
- Class: Bivalvia
- Order: Ostreida
- Family: Ostreidae
- Genus: Crassostrea
- Species: C. rhizophorae

Binomial name
- Crassostrea rhizophorae (Guilding, 1828)

= Crassostrea rhizophorae =

Species of bivalve

Crassostrea rhizophorae, also known as the mangrove cupped oyster, is a species of euryhaline bivalve in the family Ostreidae. The common name mangrove cupped oyster comes from its association with the red mangrove tree Rhizophora mangle. C. rhizophorae is one of the predominant oyster species in the South Atlantic, specifically in Central and South America. It is often found in the vast mangrove ecosystem along the coast of multiple countries such as Brazil, Venezuela, Cuba, Mexico, Puerto Rico and many other along the Caribbean coastline.

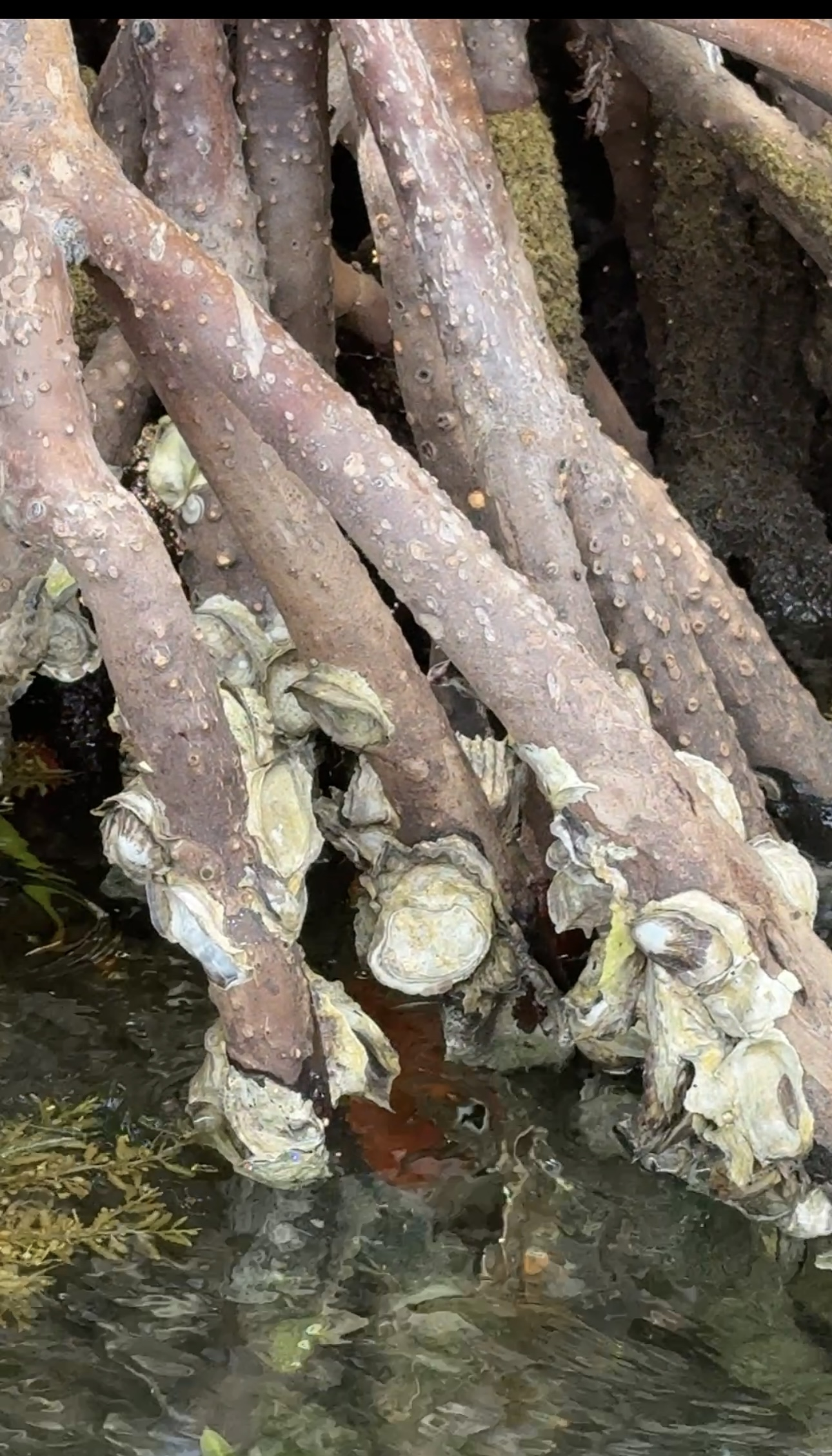
Crassostrea Rhizophorae oysters attached to red mangrove roots in Lajas Puerto Rico on July 1, 2025.

== Characteristics ==
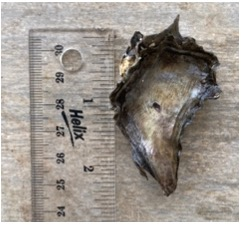
Adult Crassostrea rhizophorae harvested from red mangrove (Rhizophora mangle) prop roots on Isla Magueyes, Puerto Rico on September 3, 2024.

C. rhizophorae is often called the Caribbean or mangrove oyster due to the environment that it is found in. This species of oysters is an oviparous species, which indicates that they are animals that reproduce by laying their eggs without much embryonic development within the mother. C. rhizophorae, and more generally the genus, Crassostrea, are cup-like, or cupped, oysters, meaning that the shell itself has a cup shape to it.

C. rhizophorae has a promyal chamber and small ostia. The oyster also has a thin, foliaceous, deeply cupped right valve and the upper left valve is small and flat, which enables it to fit into the lower one. The beak is twisted dorsally, and the muscle scar is near the dorsal margin of the shell. The shell is primarily composed of Calcium carbonate (CaCO3). Internally its anatomy consists of an abductor muscle, gills, labial palp, hinge, mouth, anus, mantle, digestive gland, heart and intestine, its muscle scar is often unpigmented.

Adult C. rhizophorae can reach up to 10 cm (3.9 in) in height. However, in their natural environment, their growth is stunted, leading to a maximum height of 5 cm (2.0 in).

== Life cycle ==
Adult Crassostrea rhizophorae spawn into the water column where the eggs get fertilized by the sperm. The zygote is the first stage in its larval period which can last from a couple of hours up to approximately 24 hours. When the larvae starts developing a cilia the trochophore stage begins, they are now free-swimming. This stage lasts approximately 12h until the shell starts to develop, changing into D-shaped veliger larvae. At the 20h mark approximately, it will develop the Umbo, for the next 4 days it will be developing until and eye spot and a pedal organ will begin to develop. Both will help in the process of identifying and settling in the selected substrate, this period is called the pediveliger phase which lasts around 16 days. Now the larvae settle and commence the metamorphosis and settlement process. Finally after settled the larvae will begin to form gills and other organs finishing its post larval stage which can last up to 20 days. After going through metamorphosis the larvae becomes spat and finishes developing its organs.

== Reproduction and growth ==
=== Reproduction ===
C. rhizophorae have primary bisexual gonads that form associations of cells in the connective tissue anterior to the heart by the time they reach 0.7 cm (0.28 in), or 45 days after setting. The gonada has cells for both sexes but this is shown the most with spermatogenesis cells in 90% of animals that are sexually mature before reaching 2.0 cm (0.79 in), or 120 days after setting. In older individuals ranging from 6 to 18 months and 4 to 6 cm (1.6 to 2.4 in) in size, 83.5% were females so most change happened between 2 and 4 cm (0.79 and 1.57 in) in size, yet only 0.5% are hermaphrodictic. The active gonad goes through prematuration and maturation stage before spawning and then after partial spawning, the gonad enters a recuperation stage. During this stage, the gametogenesis starts a new maturation that leads to the complete cytolysis of the gamete and obliteration of the follicles. Most adult oysters ranging from 4 to 6 cm (1.6 to 2.4 in) long become mature without an undifferentiated stage after the spawning or resting stage.

Due to the constant high water temperature, gametogenesis happens twice during the year, March and October. These peaks happen when drastic changes in salinity, rainy periods, but intense rains like 150 mm (5.9 in) per week depress spawning. If done in the lab, C. rhizophorae embryonic development can be done in 24 hours at a density of $10^4$ to $4 \times10^4$ ovocyte per liter when fertilized at concentrations of 500 to 5000 spermatozoans per ovocyte. From this it was determined that the best range of salinities for embryonic development is 25% to 37% and the best temperatures are around 25 but below 30 degrees Celsius.

=== Growth ===
C. rhizophorae can grow in a variety of locations, but grow best in the roots of mangroves. C. rhizophorae tend to grow to 4 to 7 cm (1.6 to 2.8 in) long, and it can take up to 18 months for most members of the species to reach their full size. The maximum size of C. rhizophorae is approximately 7 to 8 cm (2.8 to 3.1 in). Adult C. rhizophorae can reach up to 10 cm (3.9 in) in height. However, in their natural environment, their growth is stunted, leading to a maximum height of 5 cm (2.0 in).

C. rhizophorae begin their life as floating larvae, which soon settle onto a solid substrate. Once settled onto their substrate, the growing oysters are known as spat. Spat grow 1 cm (0.39 in) a month for the first 3 months and then growth rates slow to an approximate growth of 0.78 cm (0.31 in) a month. After reaching 6.5 cm (2.6 in), growth rates drop considerably. C. rhizophorae grow best during the rainy season due to a higher influx of nutrients into estuarine areas.

The size class between 4.1 and 6.0 cm (1.6 and 2.4 in) is of most interest for fishers, as oysters of this size tend to yield the most meat. The best time to harvest C. rhizophorae is 2 years after spawning.

== Environment ==
C. rhizophorae is typically found in the intertidal or shallow subtidal regions of tropical mangroves and other estuarine regions. They are found along the coast line of Caribbean Islands and throughout Central and South American territories. The optimal vertical range for C. rhizophorae is between 1.0 and 1.5 m (3 ft 3 in and 4 ft 11 in) above the 0.0 m level of spring tides. At greater depths, the substrate is too soft for the oysters to settle and the pressure from predators like crabs and fish is too extreme. Above 1.5 m (4 ft 11 in), C. rhizophorae will not settle due to extensive exposure time. Due to the narrow vertical band that C. rhizophorae inhabits, species survive best when securely fixed on rocks, hard substrates, and on mangrove roots, such as the aerial roots of the red mangrove (Rhizophora mangle). Like most oysters, C. rhizophorae tend for form clusters of individuals which may develop into oyster reefs.

The optimal salinity range for C. rhizophorae is approximately 7.2 to 28.8‰, however, it can tolerate significant salinity fluctuations of short duration, which are experienced in the Caribbean, Central and South America during the rainy seasons. C. rhizophorae thrives best in temperatures below 30 °C (86 °F). While it is able to withstand fluctuations, very few larvae are found at temperatures exceeding 30 °C. Additionally C. rhizophorae has been reported to inhabit environments with a pH range of 7.7–8.3 and dissolved oxygen concentrations from 2.0 to 5 mg/L. However, favorable conditions for survival and growth are found at salinities of 15–25 ppt, oxygen concentrations of 2–4.4 mg/L, and water temperatures ranging from 22 to 28 °C

== Diet ==
C. rhizophorae tend to consume any microscopic particles that are carried in suspension in the water, regardless of their nutritional value. They consume a great range of organisms belonging to the following groups: Cyanobacteria, Xanthophyta, Bacillariophyta, Dinophyta, Euglenophyta, Chlorophyta, Protozoa, Rotifera, Annelida, Arthropoda, and Mollusca. C. rhizophorae have also been shown to consume fragments of Phytoplankton, Zooplankton, and Phanerogamae and grains of sediment. A study found that Bacillariophyta was the dominant group of consumption by C. rhizophorae at 63% of the food content in the stomach, followed by Chlorophyta at 12% of the food content in the stomach. This study also looked at the percentage of food items in the stomach contents. They categorized certain amounts of food as "full", "almost full", "almost empty", and "empty". 57% of the individuals were categorized as being in the full stage, which suggests the existence of good availability of food for C. rhizophorae in the environment that they are in.

== Fishing industry ==
C. rhizophorae is a vital fishery resource for the Caribbean and South Atlantic. In the early 2000s, as many as 5,600 metric tons of C. rhizophorae were harvested in the Caribbean and South Atlantic. Due to high consumer demands and declines in C. rhizophorae populations due to pollution, C. rhizophorae is now most commonly farmed using artificial reefs known as farming platforms. These platforms are typically made of branches of mangrove trees suspended from racks in the inter- and sub-tidal regions. These allow for farmers to maintain populations of C. rhizophorae that meet consumer demands while preventing overfishing.

The artificial reefs of C. rhizophorae have also acted as nursery environments for many marine and estuarine species in the Caribbean. These artificial reefs also provide a reproductive substrate for fishes and protect them from predation.

== Contaminant bioaccumulation ==
C. rhizophorae shows a high tolerance to changing environmental conditions, which makes it suitable as a bioindicator in coastal ecosystems. As a filter-feeding species, it consumes phytoplankton and suspended particles, while also incorporating chemical contaminants present in the water. A single individual is capable of filtering approximately 50 gallons of water per day, increasing its probability of accumulating pollutants such as heavy metals, pesticides, and other compounds.

Through this filtering activity, C. rhizophorae accumulates pollutants through bioaccumulation, a process in which the concentration of pollutants in marine organisms increases over time as they absorb substances from the environment. This process includes bioconcentration, where contaminants transfer directly from water into tissues. It also involves biomagnification, in which contaminants accumulate through dietary intake, resulting in higher concentrations in the higher trophic levels of the food web. Since seafood is a major source of human exposure to trace elements, contaminant levels in oysters are also relevant for evaluating potential risks to human health.

Research conducted in Vitoria Bay shows that C. rhizophorae can bioaccumulate trace elements like arsenic to levels that may be potential risks to human health. The study used accepted risk indicators and found arsenic levels exceeded limits at many stations in the estuary, suggesting the possibility of health effects, including cancer risks over a lifetime. These findings emphasize the importance of understanding bioaccumulation in oysters, including how environmental factors like salinity can influence contaminant uptake and human exposure.

== Ecological services ==
Crassostrea rhizophorae provides several key ecosystem services within tropical estuaries and mangrove systems. Its filter-feeding improves water quality by removing suspended particles and excess nutrients, while its reef structures help stabilize shorelines by trapping sediments and reducing wave energy. Oyster clusters create refuge and foraging habitat for a variety of fish and invertebrates, increasing local biodiversity and adding structural complexity to the seascape. These reefs also support seafood production by enhancing populations of recreationally and commercially important species. In addition, oyster growth and reef formation contribute to carbon sequestration and can stimulate primary production in surrounding waters.
