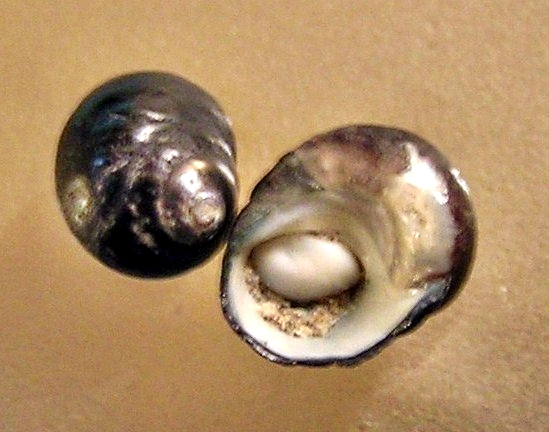
- Two views of a shell of Prisogaster elevatus

Scientific classification
- Kingdom: Animalia
- Phylum: Mollusca
- Class: Gastropoda
- Subclass: Vetigastropoda
- Order: Trochida
- Family: Turbinidae
- Genus: Prisogaster
- Species: P. elevatus

Binomial name
- Prisogaster elevatus (Eydoux & Souleyet, 1852)

Synonyms
- Turbo elevatus Eydoux & Souleyet, 1852; Turbo propinquus Hupé

= Prisogaster elevatus =

Species of gastropod

Prisogaster elevatus is a species of sea snail, a marine gastropod mollusk in the family Turbinidae, the turban snails.

== Description ==
The height of the shell attains 13 mm, its diameter 12 mm. "The imperforate shell has an ovate-conic shape. Its color is ashy-black. The acute spire is elevated. The five whorls are convex, slightly excavated at the sutures. They are nearly smooth and obsoletely spirally lirate. The large body whorl is convex below. The ovate aperture is silvery within. The lip is black. The planate columella has a depressed-concave shape and is not produced at its base."

"The ovate operculum is yellowish inside. It contains two to three whorls and a sublateral nucleus. The outer surface is convex, white, rugose and subumbilicate."

== Distribution ==
This species occurs in the Pacific Ocean off Chile.
