= Caleta Chañaral =

Village in Huasco, Chile

Coordinates: 29°04′40″S 71°29′25″W

- Village
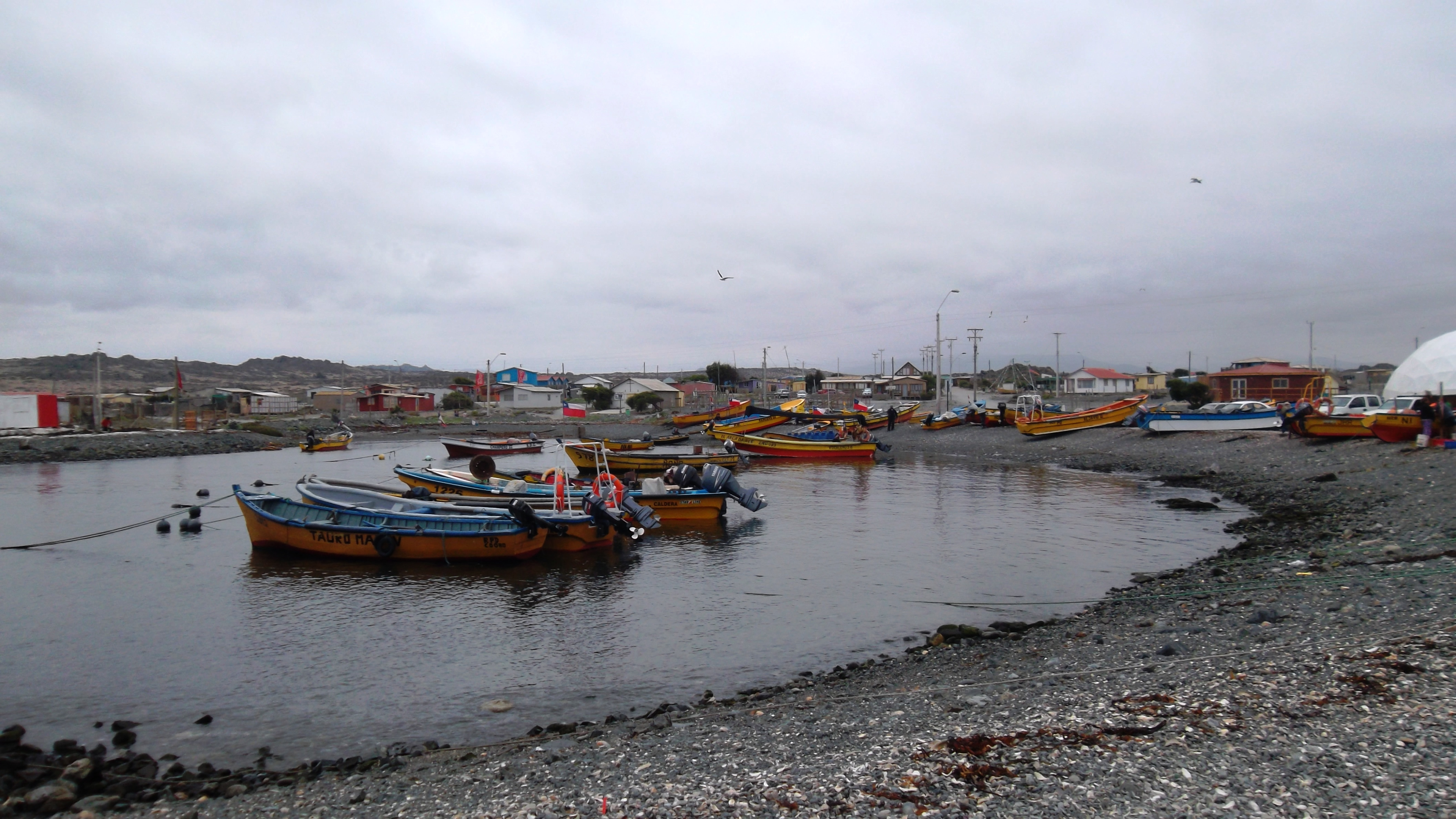
- Interactive map of Caleta Chañaral
- Country: Chile
- Region: Chile
- Province: Huasco
- Commune: Freirina

Population (2002)
  - Total: 71

Caleta Chañaral and its interior village Chañaral de Aceituno are located at the southwest end of the commune of Freirina, Chile. In front of the cove is Chañaral Island, from which it is possible to observe, at certain times of the year, different groups of dolphins.

== Tourism ==
Bottlenose dolphins (the most intelligent of their species) remain in the same place, in an approximate radius of one kilometer, which they rarely leave.

== Economy ==
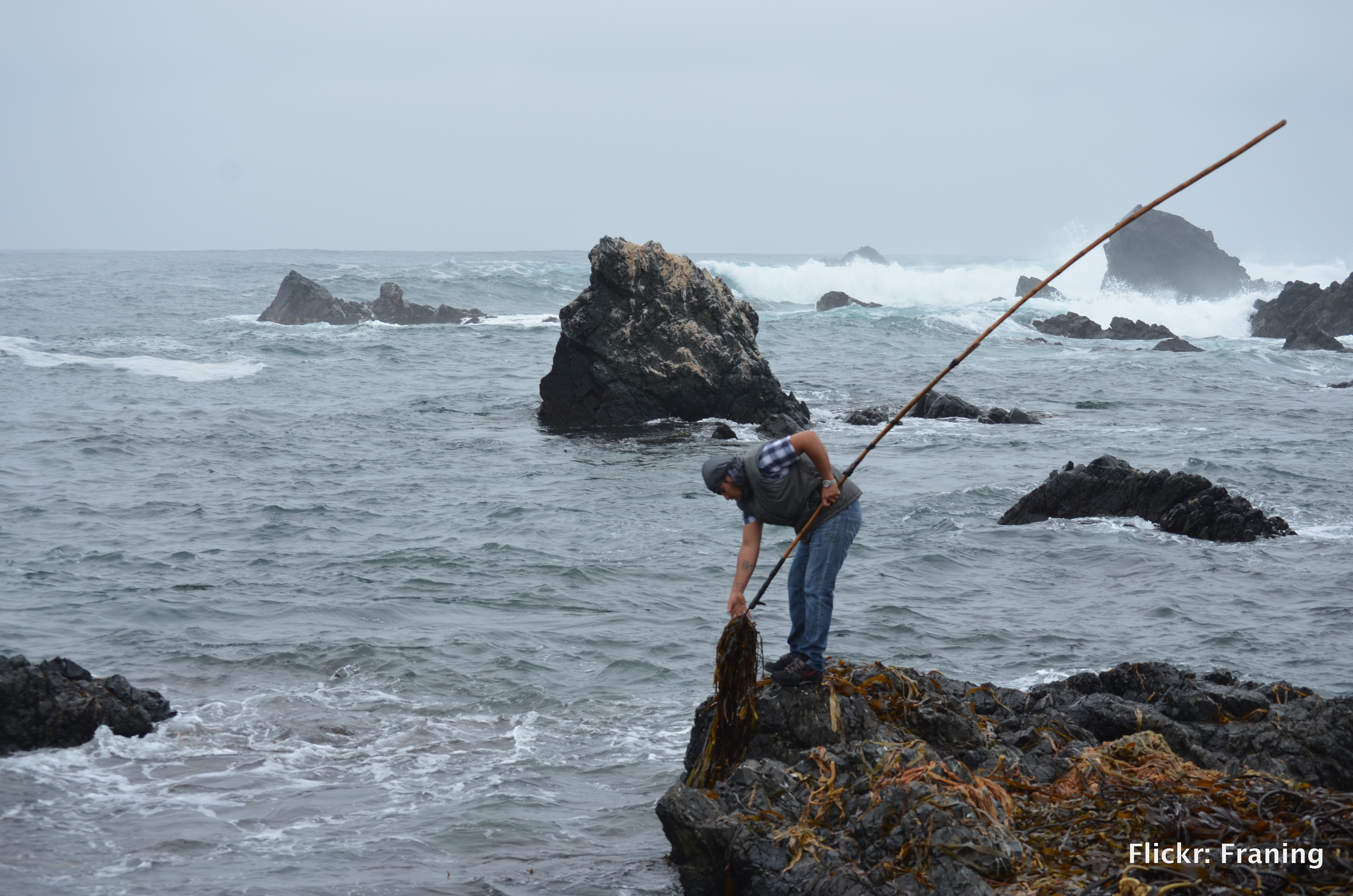
Fisherman collecting algae at Caleta Chañaral

Inland from Caleta Chañaral, in the Chañaral de Aceituno sector, some families of fishermen and farmers live who maintain olive production and goat management as sources of income. Fishing is abundant in the area.

Mining activity is also feasible due to the presence of some deposits in the vicinity.

== Services ==
Currently, the locality has rural drinking water supply and electricity through a generator group, so the construction of the electrical grid to the place is being proposed. This locality has a Mothers' Center, Rural Health Center, Neighborhood Association, Sports Club, and Fishermen's Union.

== Transportation ==
Access to the locality is via Route 5. If traveling to the locality from the south, take the Los Choros/Punta de Choros exit; if traveling to the locality from the north, take a detour in front of the town of Domeyko, the C-500 route, a well-maintained gravel road of 78 kilometers.

- From Santiago, the journey takes approximately 7 hours.
- From Vallenar, buses leave every Wednesday and Friday at noon (3 pm, as of 2014–15) on Avenida Brasil and return on Sundays (around 4 pm, as of 2014–15) with an estimated duration of 2 hours.
- From Serena, buses leave every day at 9:00.
