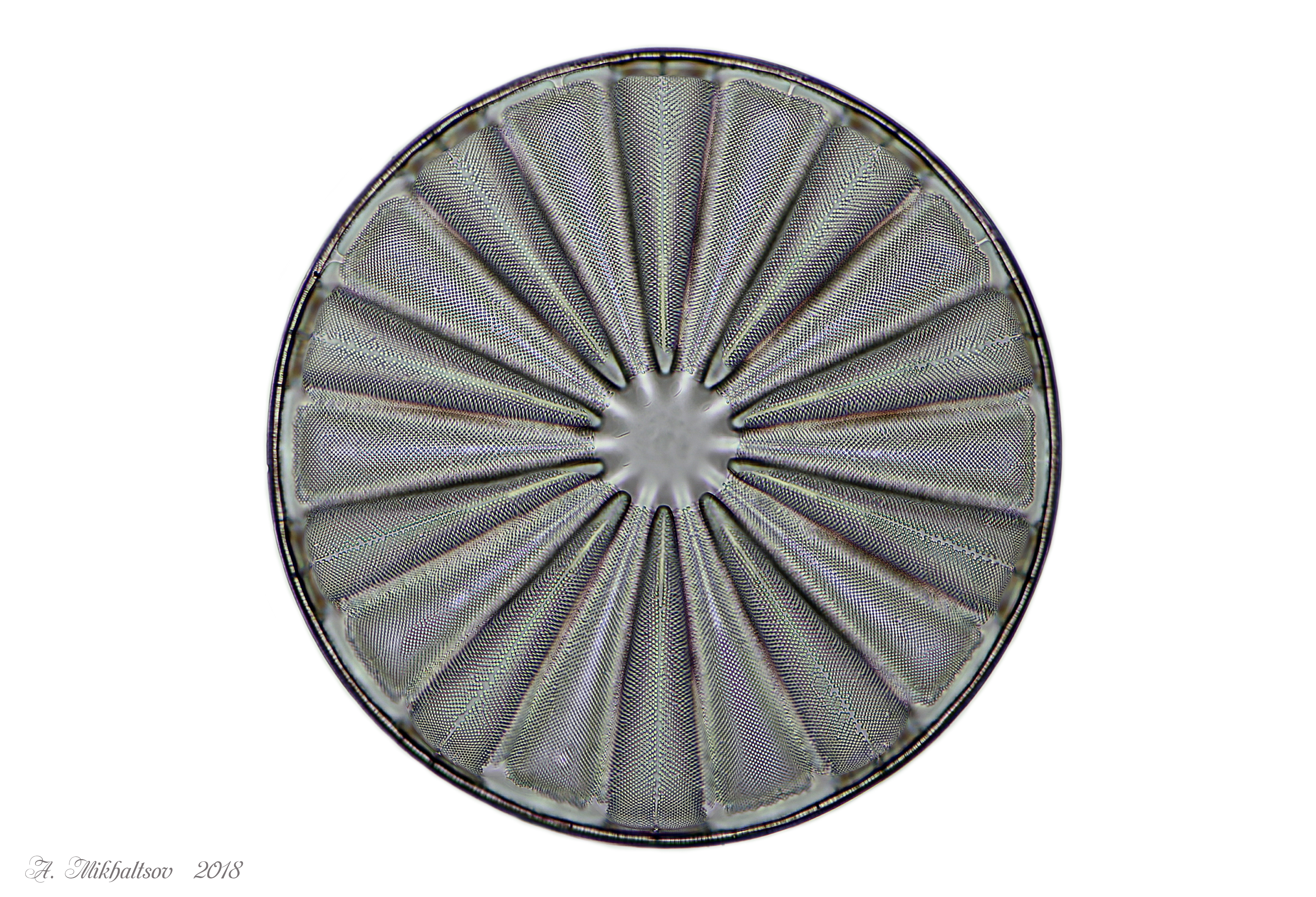
- Fossil of Actinoptychus splendens

Scientific classification
- Domain: Eukaryota
- Clade: Diaphoretickes
- Clade: SAR
- Clade: Stramenopiles
- Phylum: Gyrista
- Subphylum: Ochrophytina
- Class: Bacillariophyceae
- Order: Coscinodiscales
- Family: Heliopeltaceae
- Genus: Actinoptychus; Ehrenberg, 1843

Extant species
- Actinoptychus octodenarius; Actinoptychus senarius

= Actinoptychus =

Genus of diatoms

Actinoptychus is a genus of diatoms belonging to the family Heliopeltaceae.

The genus was described in 1843 by Christian Gottfried Ehrenberg.

Species:

- Actinoptychus octodenarius Ehrenberg
- Actinoptychus senarius (Ehrenberg) Ehrenberg, 1843
