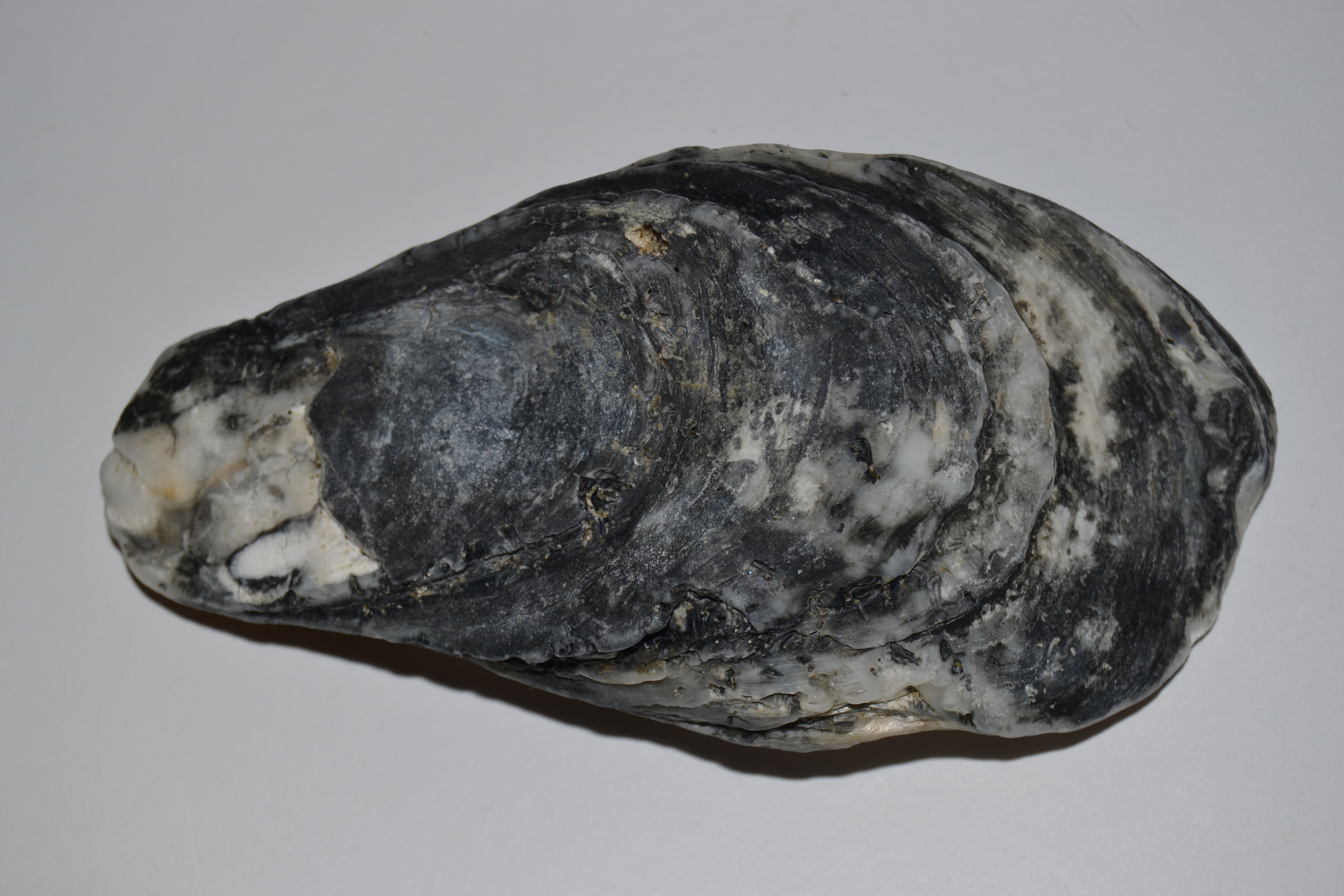
- Eastern oyster (Crassostrea virginica)

Scientific classification
- Kingdom: Animalia
- Phylum: Mollusca
- Class: Bivalvia
- Order: Ostreida
- Family: Ostreidae
- Genus: Crassostrea; Sacco, 1897

Species
- See text

Synonyms
- Ostrea (Crassostrea) Dall, 1909

= Crassostrea =

Crassostrea Temporal range: 145.5–0 Ma

Genus of bivalves

Crassostrea is a genus of true oysters (family Ostreidae) containing some of the most important oysters used for food.

The genus was recent split in WoRMS, following the DNA-based phylogenies of Salvi et al. (2014 and 2017). Pacific species were moved to a new genus Magallana. C. zhanjiangensis became Talonostrea zhanjiangensis. The changes are not universally welcomed by oyster researchers, as C. gigas (now M. gigas) is "one of the most researched species of marine invertebrate".

== Species ==
Extant species are:

- Crassostrea aequatorialis (A. d'Orbigny, 1846)
- Crassostrea columbiensis (Hanley, 1846)
- Crassostrea corteziensis (Hertlein, 1951)
- Crassostrea mangle Amaral & Simone, 2014
- Crassostrea rhizophorae (Guilding, 1828)
- Crassostrea tulipa (Lamarck, 1819) – mangrove oyster
- Crassostrea virginica (Gmelin, 1791) – eastern oyster

=== Fossil species ===
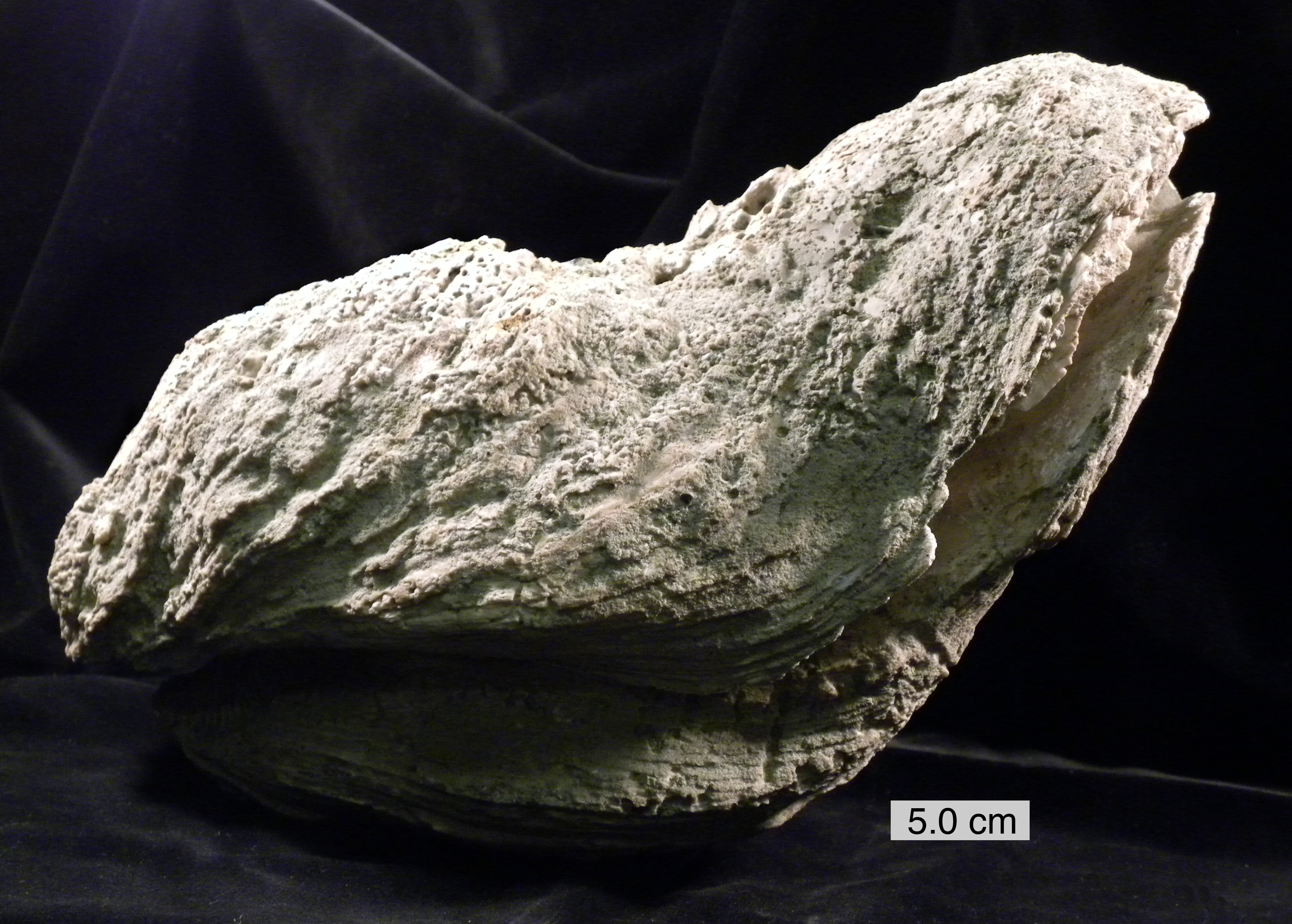
Crassostrea gigantissima (Finch, 1824) from the Eocene of Texas.

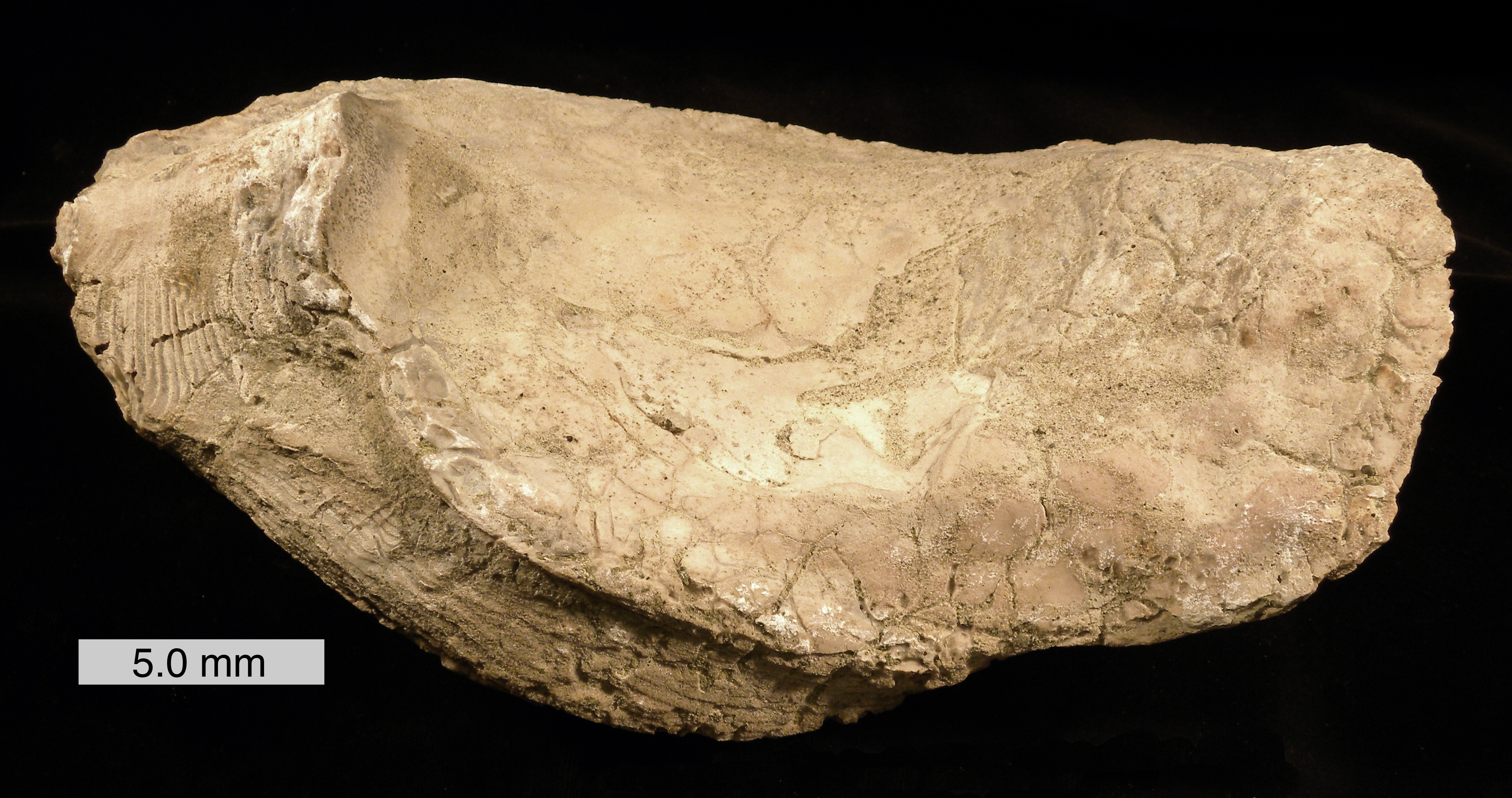
Crassostrea gigantissima (Finch, 1824) right valve interior (Eocene of Texas).

Fossil species include:

- †Crassostrea alabamiensis (Lea 1833)
- †Crassostrea ashleyi (Hertlein 1943) (syn. Ostrea arnoldi)
- †Crassostrea cahobasensis (Pilsbry and Brown 1910)
- †Crassostrea contracta (Conrad 1865)
- †Crassostrea cucullaris (Lamarck 1819)
- †Crassostrea cuebana (Jung 1974)
- †Crassostrea elegans (Deshayes, 1832) (syn. †Cubitostrea elegans Deshayes 1832 or Crassostrea (Cubitostrea) elegans)
- †Crassostrea gigantissima (Finch 1824) – Giant fossil oyster
- †Crassostrea gryphoides (Schlotheim 1813)
- †Crassostrea hatcheri (Ihering 1899)
- †Crassostrea ingens (Zittel 1864)
- †Crassostrea kawauchidensis (Tamura 1977)
- †Crassostrea patagonica (d'Orbigny 1842) (syn. Ostrea ferrarisi)
- †Crassostrea raincourti (Deshayes 1858)
- †Crassostrea titan (Conrad 1853) (syn. Ostrea prior, O. andersoni)
- †Crassostrea transitoria (Hupé 1854) (syn. Ostrea maxima)
- †Crassostrea wyomingensis

== Genetics ==
The genome of Crassostrea gigas (now Magallana gigas) has been recently sequenced revealing an extensive set of genes that enable it to cope with environmental stresses.
