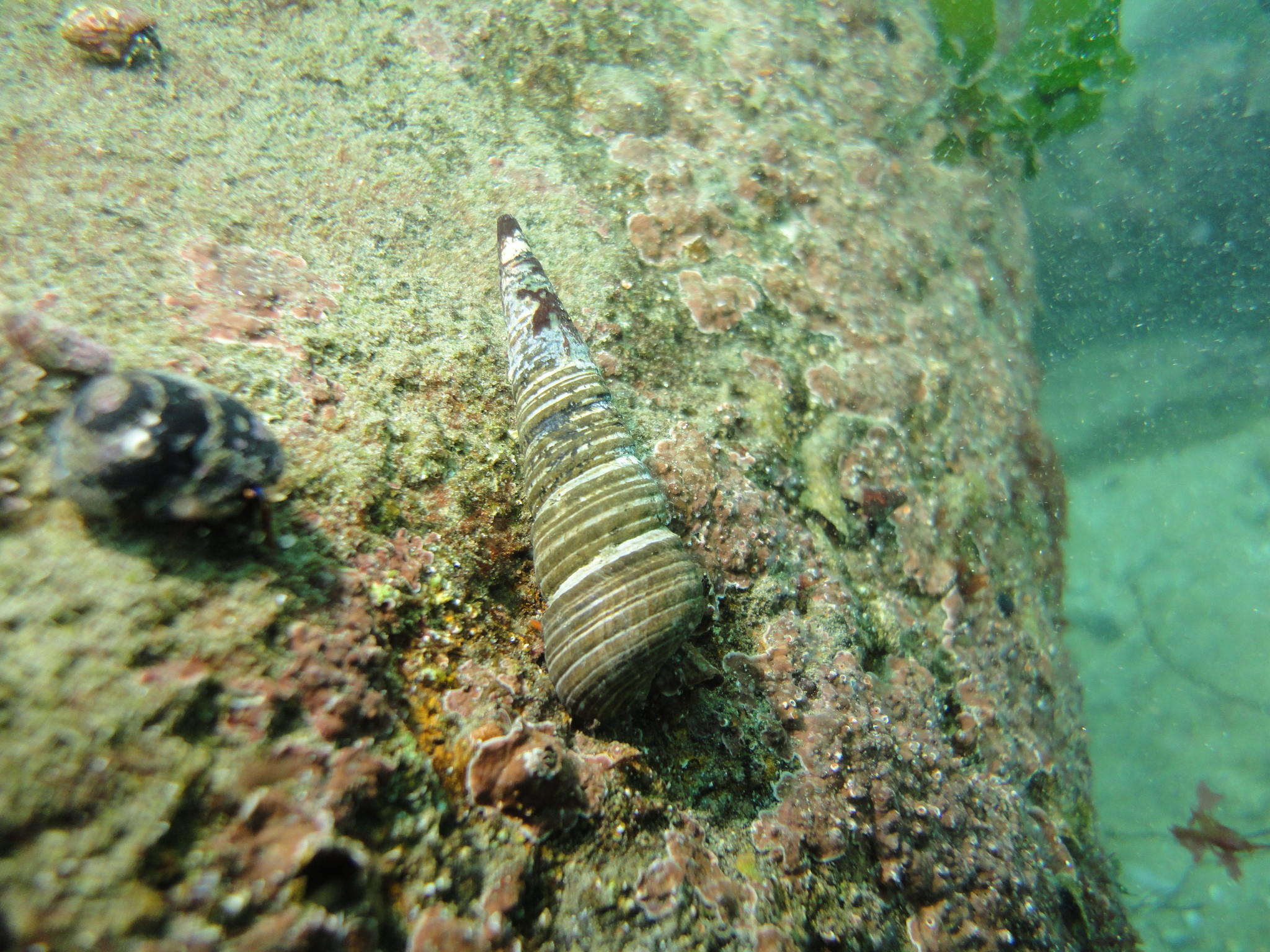
- Incatella cingulata

Scientific classification
- Kingdom: Animalia
- Phylum: Mollusca
- Class: Gastropoda
- Subclass: Caenogastropoda
- Order: incertae sedis
- Family: Turritellidae
- Subfamily: Turritellinae
- Genus: Incatella; DeVries, 2007

Diversity
- 6 species

= Incatella =

Genus of gastropods

Incatella is a genus of sea snails, marine gastropod mollusks in the family Turritellidae.

== Species ==
Species within the genus Incatella include:

- Incatella cingulata (G.B. Sowerby I, 1825)
- Incatella cingulatiformis (Möricke, 1896)
- Incatella chilensis (Sowerby, 1846)
- Incatella leptogramma (Philippi, 1887)
- †Incatella hupei Nielsen, 2007
- Incatella trilirata (Philippi, 1887)
