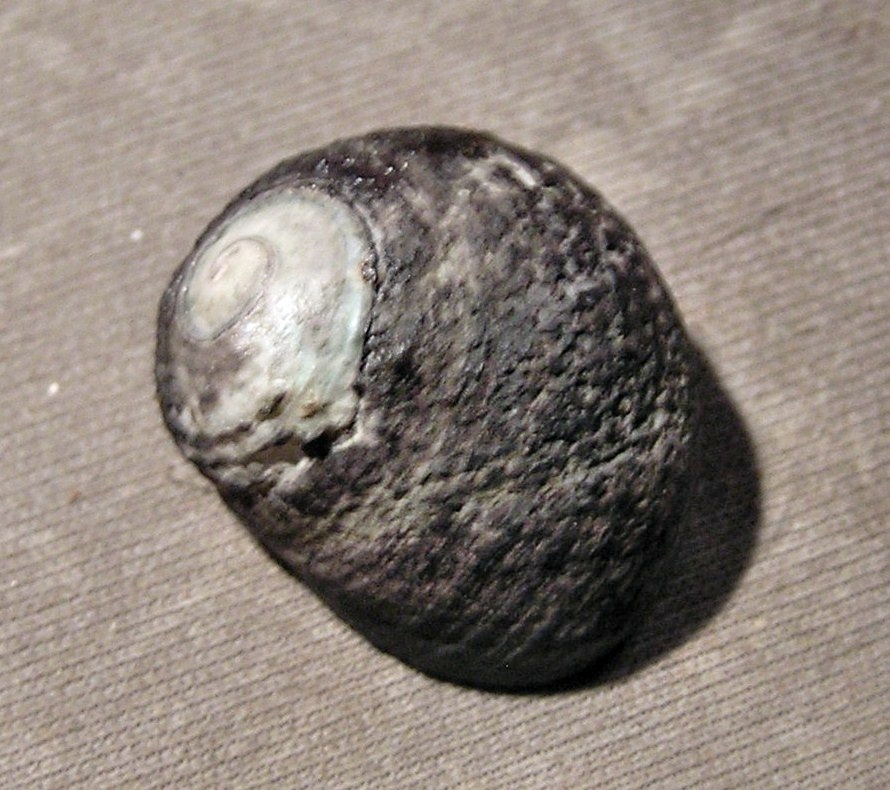
- Top view of a shell of Prisogaster niger

Scientific classification
- Kingdom: Animalia
- Phylum: Mollusca
- Class: Gastropoda
- Subclass: Vetigastropoda
- Order: Trochida
- Superfamily: Trochoidea
- Family: Turbinidae
- Genus: Prisogaster; Mörch, 1850

Type species
- Turbo niger W. Wood, 1828

Synonyms
- Amyxa Troschel, 1852

= Prisogaster =

Genus of gastropods

Prisogaster is a genus of sea snails, marine gastropod mollusks in the subfamily Prisogasterinae of the family Turbinidae, the turban snails.

== Description ==
"The very solid, imperforate shell has an ovate or subglobular shape. It is dark colored. The large aperture is oblique. The inner surface of the operculum is yellow, subconcave, with a submarginal, basal nucleus. Its outer surface is very convex."

Radula: "The median tooth has a very wide body, and supporting wings. The cusp narrowly reflects along the whole upper margin of the tooth. The laterals show prominent cusps, their bases are denticulate. The inner marginals are not enlarged, but rather narrow, with long simple cusps. The outer marginals show long serrate cusps. In the denticulate cusps of the lateral teeth, and the narrow inner marginals this form approaches more closely than any other to Leptothyra. "

== Species ==
Species within the genus Prisogaster include:

- Prisogaster elevatus (Eydoux & Souleyet, 1852)
- Prisogaster niger (Wood, 1828)
