= Macaronichnus =

Ichnogenus of trace fossil

Macaronichnus is an ichnogenus of trace fossil that appears from the Cambrian era to the modern era. Macaronichnus is attributed to the deposit-feeding of worms in high-energy, sandy shallow-marine environments.

The environmental preferences of Macaronichnus are high-energy foreshores and shallow shorefaces. Macaronichnus is an indicator of temperate to cold waters.

== See also ==
- Ichnology
