= Grammatophora (alga) =

Scientific classification
- Domain: Eukaryota
- Clade: Sar
- Clade: Stramenopiles
- Division: Ochrophyta
- Clade: Bacillariophyta
- Class: Fragilariophyceae
- Order: Rhabdonematales
- Family: Grammatophoraceae
- Genus: Grammatophora; Ehrenberg, 1840

Extant species
- Grammatophora marina; Grammatophora oceanica

Genus of Chromista

Grammatophora is a genus of Chromista belonging to the family Grammatophoraceae.

The genus was first described by C. G. Ehrenberg in 1840.

Species:

- Grammatophora marina
- Grammatophora oceanica
