= Archimediella =

- Shell of Archimediella dertonensis (original image)

Scientific classification
- Kingdom: Animalia
- Phylum: Mollusca
- Class: Gastropoda
- Subclass: Caenogastropoda
- Order: incertae sedis
- Superfamily: Cerithioidea
- Family: Turritellidae
- Genus: †Archimediella; Sacco, 1895

Type species
- † Turritella archimedis Brongniart, 1823

Species
- See text

Synonyms
- Turritella (Archimediella) Sacco, 1895 (original rank)

Extinct genus of gastropods

Archimediella is a genus of sea snails, marine gastropod mollusks in the family Turritellidae.

== General characteristics ==
(Original description in Italian) The forms in this group resemble Torcula in certain respects, so much so that the living species Turritella cochlea Reeve, which belongs to this group, was once placed within Torcula. Nevertheless, they appear to show a closer affinity to the true Turritella and to Turritella (Zaria) J. E. Gray, 1847. A fairly consistent feature of the group is the presence of two principal spiral cords on the whorls. The group is also represented by several forms in present-day seas.

== Species ==
Species within the genus Archimediella include:

- † Archimediella bonei (Baily, 1855)
- † Archimediella carpathica Harzhauser & Landau, 2019
- † Archimediella cochlias (Bayan, 1873)
- † Archimediella dertonensis (Mayer[-Eymar], 1868)
- † Archimediella hoernesi (Rolle, 1856)
- † Archimediella indigena (Eichwald, 1830)
- † Archimediella sancticlementensis Landau, Ceulemans & Van Dingenen, 2018
- † Archimediella spolongensis (K. Martin, 1916)
- † Archimediella thetis (A. d'Orbigny, 1852)
- † Archimediella vasconiensis (Cossmann & Peyrot, 1922)
- Archimediella wareni (Ryall & Vos, 2010)

Species brought into synonymy

- † Archimediella abundans (Handmann, 1882) †
- Archimediella annulata (Kiener, 1843): synonym of Turritella annulata Kiener, 1843
- Archimediella bicingulata (Lamarck, 1822): synonym of Turritella bicingulata Lamarck, 1822
- Archimediella cochlea (Reeve, 1849): synonym of Turritella cochlea Reeve, 1849 (Alternate representation)
- Archimediella conspersa (A. Adams & Reeve in Reeve, 1849): synonym of Turritella conspersa A. Adams & Reeve in Reeve, 1849 (Alternate representation)
- Archimediella dirkhartogensis Garrard, 1972: synonym of Turritella dirkhartogensis (Garrard, 1972) (Original combination)
- Archimediella fastigiata (A. Adams & Reeve in Reeve, 1849): synonym of Turritella fastigiata A. Adams & Reeve in Reeve, 1849 (Alternate representation)
- Archimediella gemmata (Reeve, 1849): synonym of Turritella gemmata Reeve, 1849 (Alternate representation)
- Archimediella maculata (Reeve, 1849): synonym of Turritella maculata Reeve, 1849
- Archimediella occidua (Cotton & N. H. Woods, 1935): synonym of Turritella terebra (Linnaeus, 1758) (Alternate representation of synonym)
- Archimediella torulosa (Kiener, 1843): synonym of Turritella torulosa Kiener, 1843
- Archimediella vermicularis (Brocchi, 1814): synonym of Helminthia vermicularis (Brocchi, 1814)
