= T. maculata =

T. maculata may refer to:

- Tajuria maculata, an Asian butterfly
- Tegeticula maculata, a North American moth
- Temnaspis maculata, a leaf beetle
- Tanipone maculata, a Malagasy ant
- Terebra maculata, an auger snail
- Terenura maculata, a South American bird
- Terrapene maculata, a box turtle
- Tetraselmis maculata, a green algae
- Teuthowenia maculata, a glass squid
- Thecacera maculata, a sea slug
- Thesprotia maculata, a praying mantis
- Tillandsia maculata, an air plant
- Timelaea maculata, a brush-footed butterfly
- Tipula maculata, a Palearctic cranefly
- Tonna maculata, a tun shell
- Toxodera maculata, a mantid native to Malaysia
- Trachylepis maculata, a Guyanese skink
- Trapania maculata, a sea slug
- Triakis maculata, a hound shark
- Trichis maculata, a ground beetle
- Trichocoptodera maculata, a ground beetle
- Trichopilia maculata, a New World orchid
- Triopha maculata, a sea slug
- Tritonia maculata, a dendronotid nudibranch
- Turritella maculata, a sea snail
