= Colpospira smithiana =

Scientific classification
- Kingdom: Animalia
- Phylum: Mollusca
- Class: Gastropoda
- Subclass: Caenogastropoda
- Order: incertae sedis
- Family: Turritellidae
- Genus: Colpospira
- Species: C. smithiana

Binomial name
- Colpospira smithiana (Donald, 1900)

Species of gastropod

Colpospira smithiana is a species of sea snail, a marine gastropod mollusk in the family Turritellidae.
