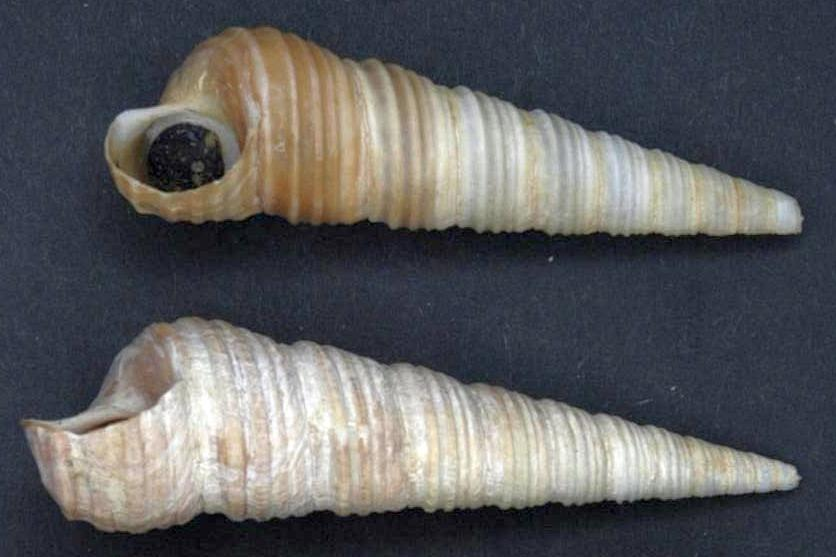

Scientific classification
- Kingdom: Animalia
- Phylum: Mollusca
- Class: Gastropoda
- Subclass: Caenogastropoda
- Order: incertae sedis
- Family: Turritellidae
- Genus: Neohaustator
- Species: N. fortilirata

Binomial name
- Neohaustator fortilirata (G. B. Sowerby III, 1914)

Synonyms
- Turritella fortilirata G. B. Sowerby III, 1914 (basionym); Turritella fortilirata multilirata Kotaka, 1951 junior homonym (invalid; not A. Adams & Reeve, 1849); Turritella huziokai Ida, 1952

= Neohaustator fortilirata =

Species of gastropod

Neohaustator fortilirata is a species of sea snail, a marine gastropod mollusk in the family Turritellidae.

== Description ==
The length of the shell attains 78 mm, its diameter 22 mm.

(Original description in Latin) The shell is turreted and rust-colored, transitioning to whitish towards the apex. It comprises 18 whorls, which are sloping, scarcely convex, and exhibit an angled profile below. Each whorl is encircled by four relatively thick spiral ridges. The body whorl constitutes one-third of the shell's overall length and is characterized by a biangulate form at its base. The base itself is slightly convex and features a single ridge. The aperture is subquadrate in shape. The peristome is thin, and the columella is slightly arched and narrow.

== Distribution ==
This marine species occurs off Japan.
