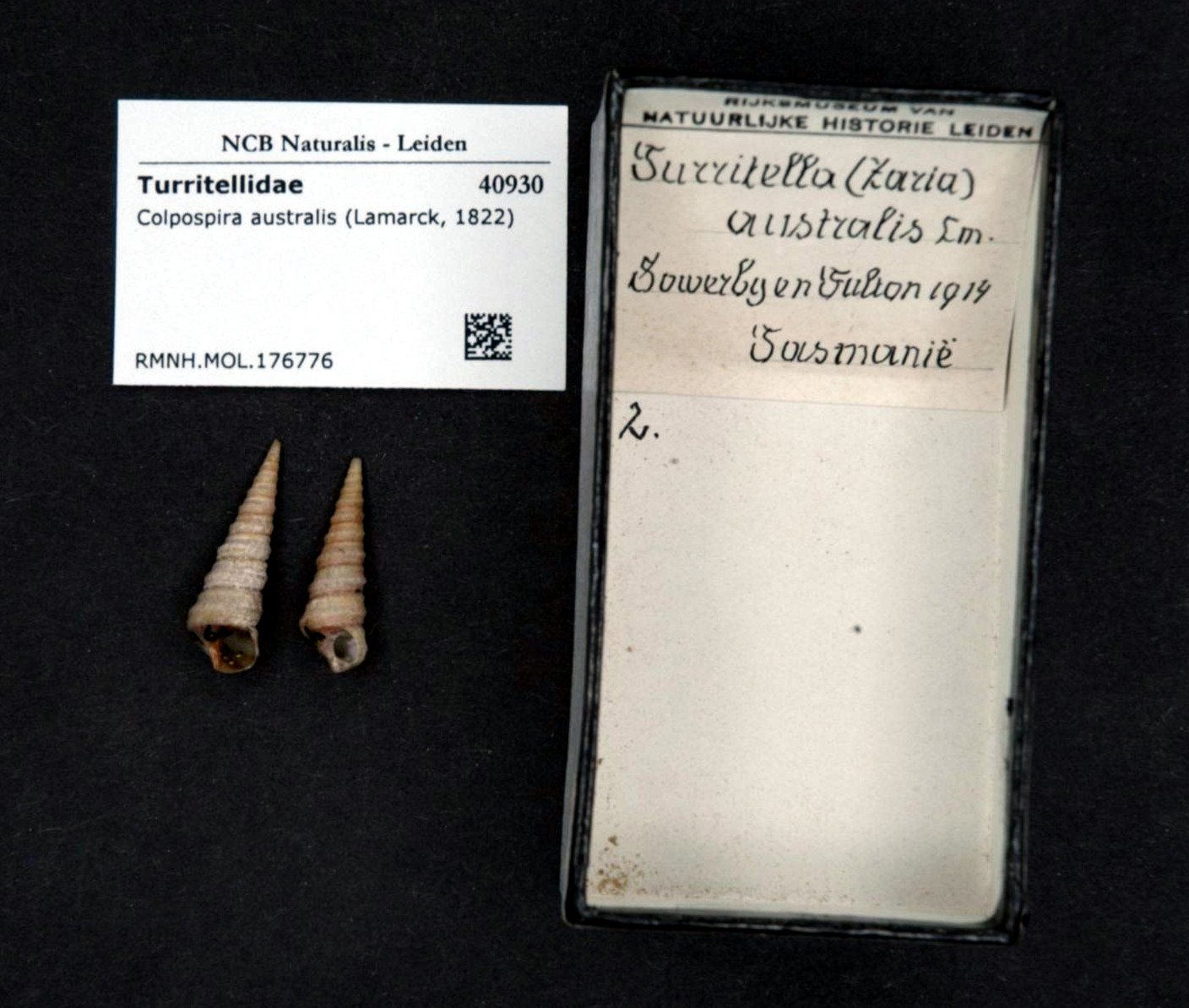
- Colpospira australis shells

Scientific classification
- Kingdom: Animalia
- Phylum: Mollusca
- Class: Gastropoda
- Subclass: Caenogastropoda
- Order: incertae sedis
- Family: Turritellidae
- Subfamily: Turritellinae
- Genus: Colpospira; Donald, 1900

= Colpospira =

Genus of gastropods

Colpospira is a genus of sea snails, marine gastropod mollusks in the family Turritellidae.

== Species ==
Species within the genus Colpospira include:

- Colpospira accisa (Watson, 1881)
- Colpospira atkinsoni (Tate & May, 1900)
- Colpospira australis (Lamarck, 1822)
- Colpospira bundilla (Garrard, 1972)
- Colpospira circumligata (Verco, 1910)
- Colpospira congelata (Adams & Reeve, 1850)
- Colpospira cordismei (Watson, 1881)
- Colpospira curialis (Hedley, 1907)
- Colpospira decoramen (Iredale, 1936)
- Colpospira deliciosa (Watson, 1881)
- Colpospira guillaumei Iredale, 1924
- Colpospira joannae (Hedley, 1923)
- Colpospira mediolevis (Verco, 1910)
- Colpospira moretonensis (Garrard, 1972)
- Colpospira musgravia (Garrard, 1982)
- Colpospira quadrata (Donald, 1900)
- Colpospira runcinata (Watson, 1881) - type species of the genus Colpospira
- Colpospira sinuata (Reeve, 1849)
- Colpospira smithiana (Donald, 1900)
- Colpospira sophiae (Brazier, 1883)
- Colpospira swainsiana (Garrard, 1982)
- Colpospira translucida (Garrard, 1972)
- Colpospira wollumbi (Garrard, 1972)
- Colpospira yarramundi (Garrard, 1972)
