= Colpospira musgravia =

Scientific classification
- Kingdom: Animalia
- Phylum: Mollusca
- Class: Gastropoda
- Subclass: Caenogastropoda
- Order: incertae sedis
- Family: Turritellidae
- Genus: Colpospira
- Species: C. musgravia

Binomial name
- Colpospira musgravia (Garrard, 1982)

Species of gastropod

Colpospira musgravia is a species of sea snail, a marine gastropod mollusk in the family Turritellidae.
