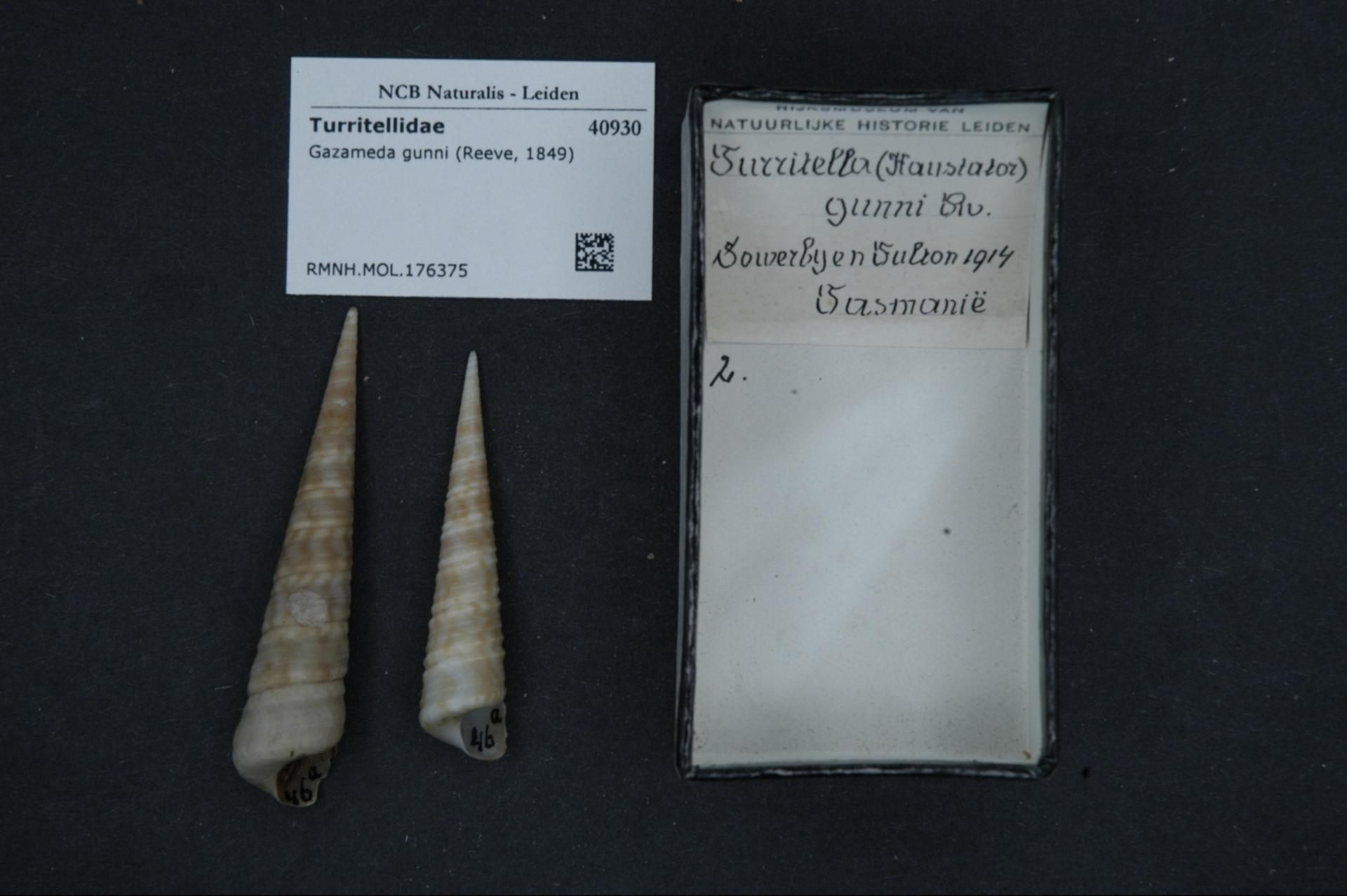

Scientific classification
- Kingdom: Animalia
- Phylum: Mollusca
- Class: Gastropoda
- Subclass: Caenogastropoda
- Order: incertae sedis
- Family: Turritellidae
- Genus: Gazameda
- Species: G. gunnii

Binomial name
- Gazameda gunnii (Reeve, 1849)

= Gazameda gunnii =

Species of gastropod

Gazameda gunnii is a species of sea snail, a marine gastropod mollusk in the family Turritellidae.
