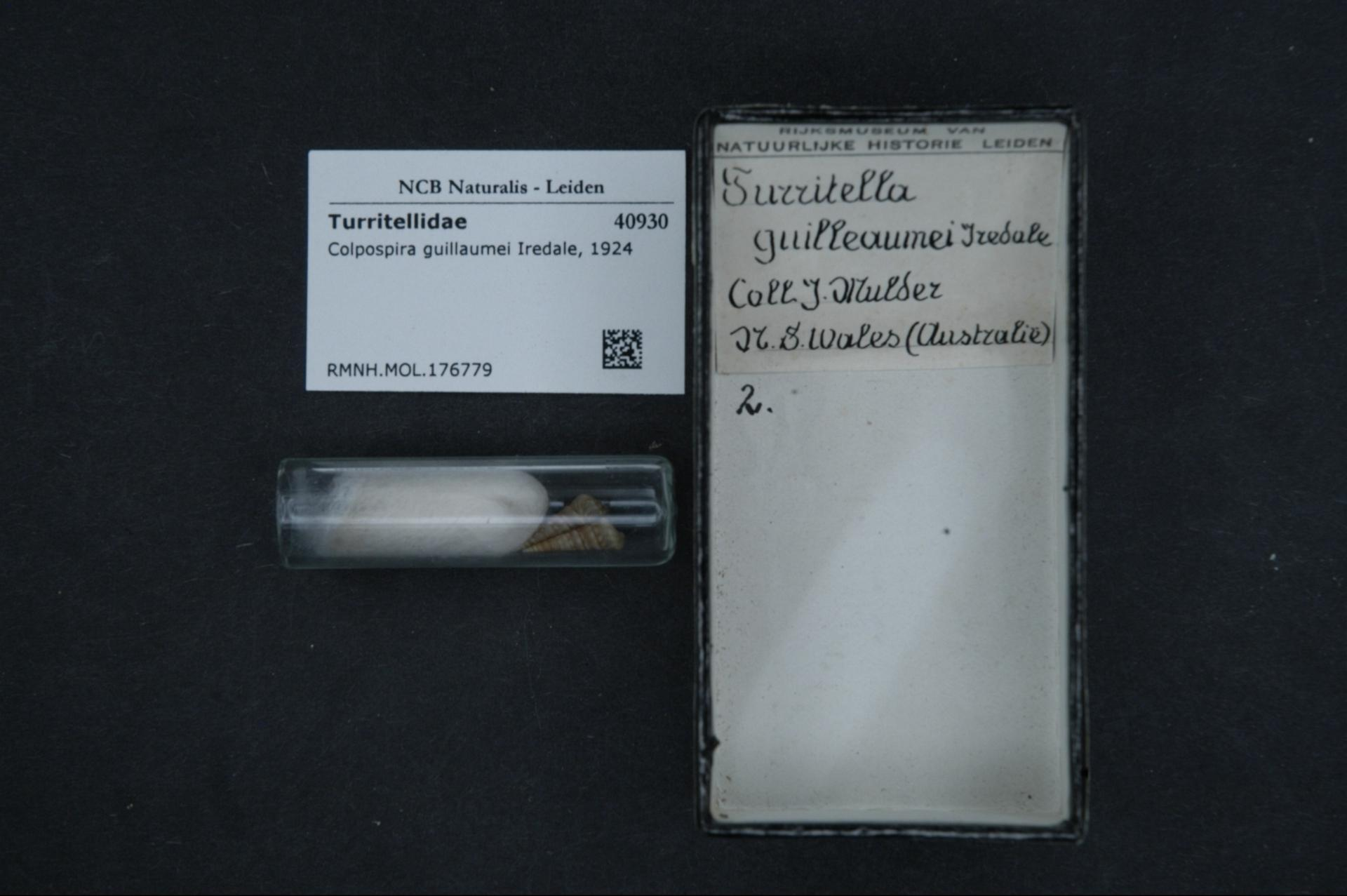
- Colpospira guillaumei shells

Scientific classification
- Kingdom: Animalia
- Phylum: Mollusca
- Class: Gastropoda
- Subclass: Caenogastropoda
- Order: incertae sedis
- Family: Turritellidae
- Genus: Colpospira
- Species: C. guillaumei

Binomial name
- Colpospira guillaumei Iredale, 1924

= Colpospira guillaumei =

Species of gastropod

Colpospira guillaumei is a species of sea snail, a marine gastropod mollusk in the family Turritellidae.
