= Turritella annulata =

Scientific classification
- Kingdom: Animalia
- Phylum: Mollusca
- Class: Gastropoda
- Subclass: Caenogastropoda
- Order: incertae sedis
- Family: Turritellidae
- Genus: Turritella
- Species: T. annulata

Binomial name
- Turritella annulata Kiener, 1843

Synonyms
- Archimediella annulata (Kiener, 1843); Turritella (Haustator) annulata Kiener, 1843 (Alternate representation)

Species of gastropod

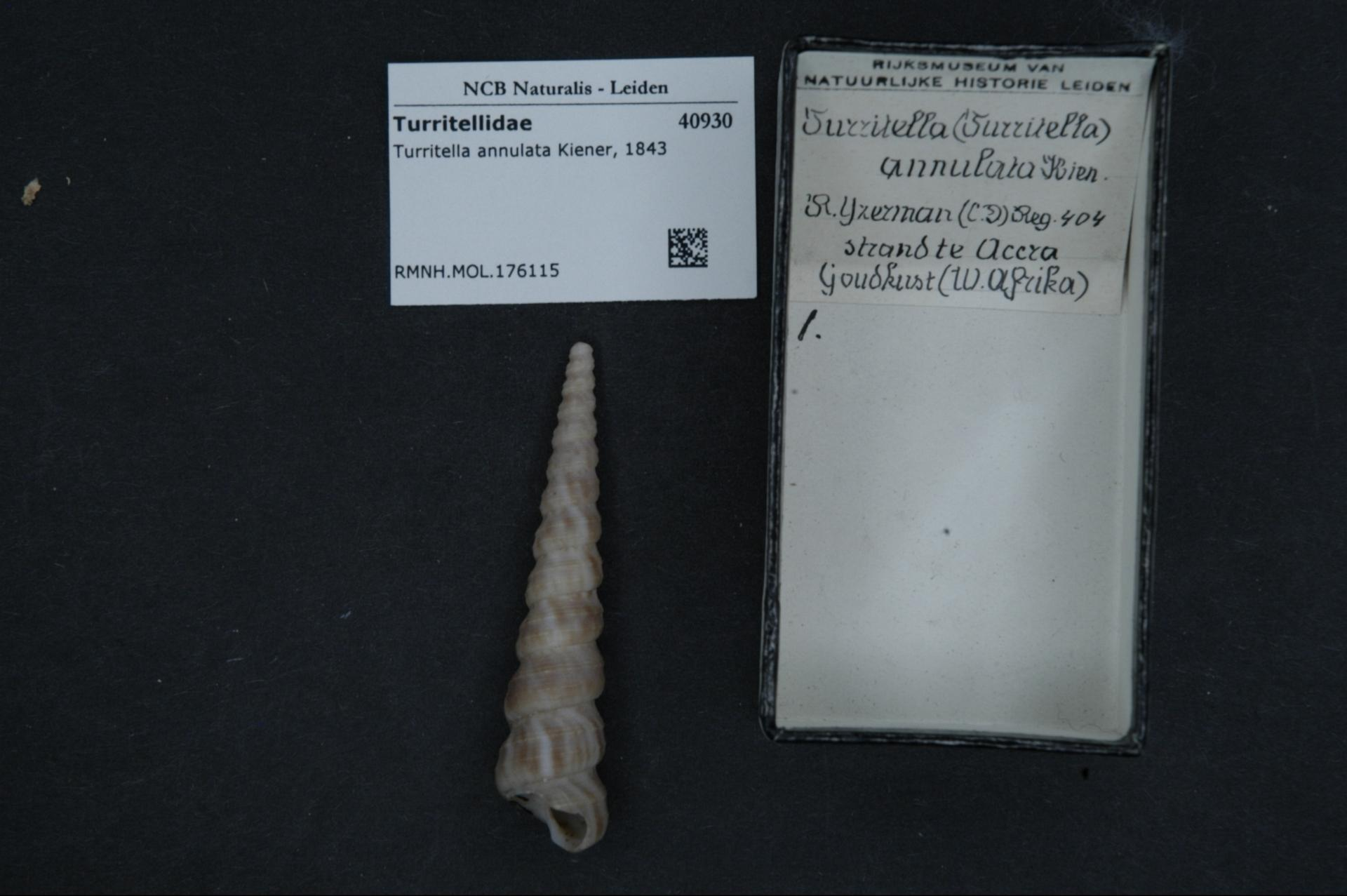
Turritella annulata, Naturalis Biodiversity Center

Turritella annulata is a species of sea snail, a marine gastropod mollusk in the family Turritellidae.

== Description ==
The height of the shell is 30-70 mm with a turret-shaped, conical outline. The teleoconch has approximately 18-20 whorls. The convex whorls have spiral striations and annular varices that may appear beaded (the latter for which the species is named, annulata). The spiral striations consist of two prominent keels separated by an indented interval. The shell's color is tawny to yellow with brown axial bands. The aperture is rounded and has a corneous operculum.

== Distribution and habitat ==
T. annulata is a marine benthic species found in the western Atlantic Ocean from the coasts of Dakar, Sengal to southern Angola. Turritellidae species prefer sandy, muddy bottoms. Specimens are found between 20 and 60 meters below the surface.

== Life Habits ==
=== Diet ===
Species in Turritellidae are suspension feeders that primarily consume plankton, detritus, and other organic matter that is suspended in the water the gastropods inhabit.

=== Reproduction ===
Turritellidae species reproduce sexually and are likely gonochoric.

=== Locomotion ===
T. annulata moves by mucus mediated gliding.
