= Gazameda madagascariensis =

Scientific classification
- Kingdom: Animalia
- Phylum: Mollusca
- Class: Gastropoda
- Subclass: Caenogastropoda
- Order: incertae sedis
- Family: Turritellidae
- Genus: Gazameda
- Species: G. madagascariensis

Binomial name
- Gazameda madagascariensis Bozzetti, 2008

Species of gastropod

Gazameda madagascariensis is a species of sea snail, a marine gastropod mollusc in the family Turritellidae.
