= Orectospira tectiformis =

Scientific classification
- Kingdom: Animalia
- Phylum: Mollusca
- Class: Gastropoda
- Subclass: Caenogastropoda
- Order: incertae sedis
- Family: Turritellidae
- Genus: Orectospira
- Species: O. tectiformis

Binomial name
- Orectospira tectiformis (Watson, 1880)

Synonyms
- Basilissa babelica Dall, 1907; Echinella tectiformis Watson, 1880

Species of gastropod

Orectospira tectiformis is a species of sea snail, a marine gastropod mollusk in the family Turritellidae.
