= Colpospira yarramundi =

Scientific classification
- Kingdom: Animalia
- Phylum: Mollusca
- Class: Gastropoda
- Subclass: Caenogastropoda
- Order: incertae sedis
- Family: Turritellidae
- Genus: Colpospira
- Species: C. yarramundi

Binomial name
- Colpospira yarramundi (Garrard, 1972)

Species of gastropod

Colpospira yarramundi is a species of sea snail, a marine gastropod mollusk in the family Turritellidae.
