= Colpospira circumligata =

Scientific classification
- Kingdom: Animalia
- Phylum: Mollusca
- Class: Gastropoda
- Subclass: Caenogastropoda
- Order: incertae sedis
- Family: Turritellidae
- Genus: Colpospira
- Species: C. circumligata

Binomial name
- Colpospira circumligata (Verco, 1910)

Species of gastropod

Colpospira circumligata is a species of sea snail, a marine gastropod mollusk in the family Turritellidae.
