= Colpospira bundilla =

Scientific classification
- Kingdom: Animalia
- Phylum: Mollusca
- Class: Gastropoda
- Subclass: Caenogastropoda
- Order: incertae sedis
- Family: Turritellidae
- Genus: Colpospira
- Species: C. bundilla

Binomial name
- Colpospira bundilla (Garrard, 1972)

Species of gastropod

Colpospira bundilla is a species of sea snail, a marine gastropod mollusk in the family Turritellidae.
