= Tachyrhynchus ventricosus =

Scientific classification
- Kingdom: Animalia
- Phylum: Mollusca
- Class: Gastropoda
- Subclass: Caenogastropoda
- Order: incertae sedis
- Family: Turritellidae
- Genus: Tachyrhynchus
- Species: T. ventricosus

Binomial name
- Tachyrhynchus ventricosus Golikov, 1986

Species of gastropod

Tachyrhynchus ventricosus is a species of sea snail, a marine gastropod mollusk in the family Turritellidae.
