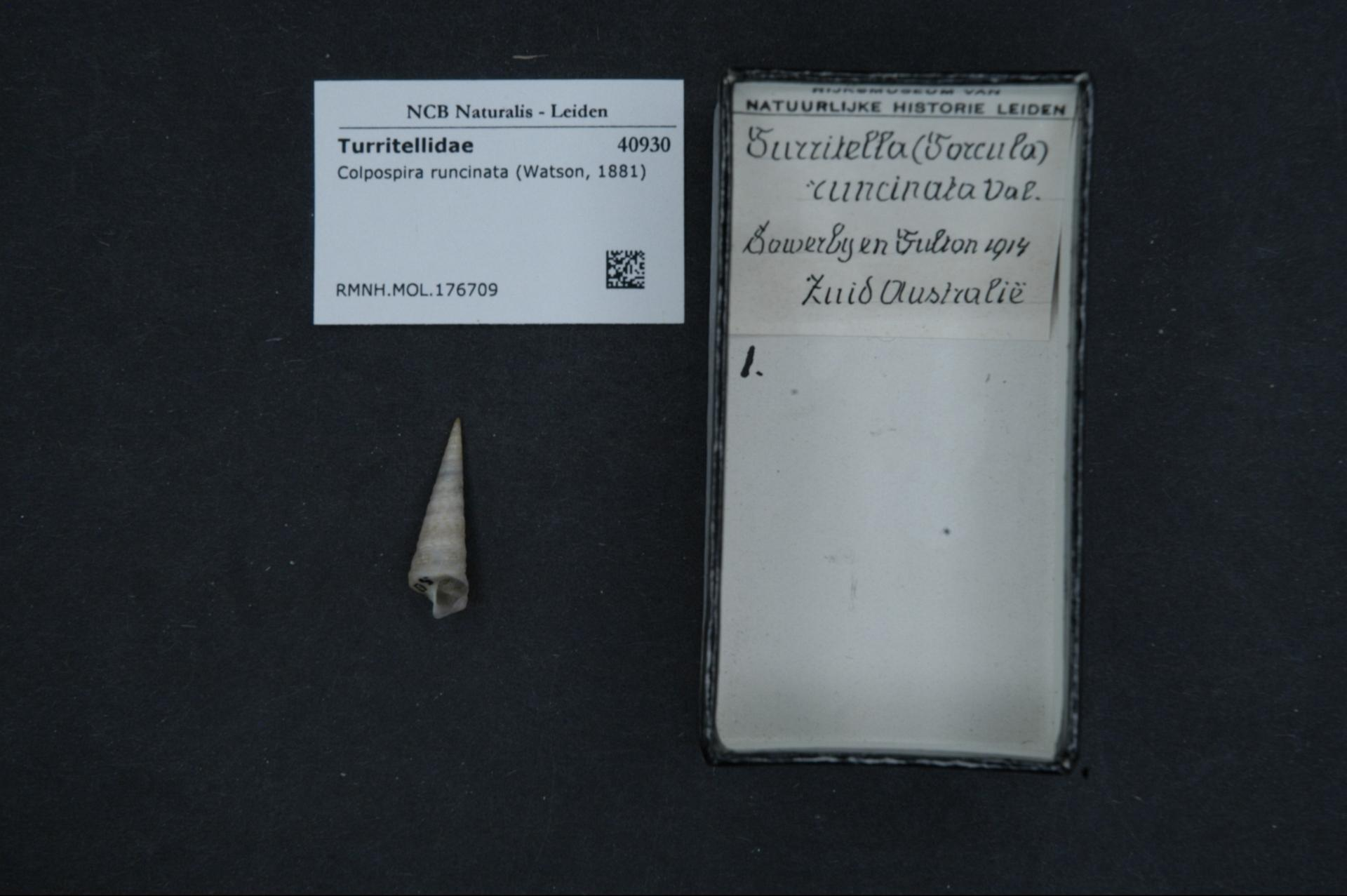
- Colpospira runcinata shell

Scientific classification
- Kingdom: Animalia
- Phylum: Mollusca
- Class: Gastropoda
- Subclass: Caenogastropoda
- Order: incertae sedis
- Family: Turritellidae
- Genus: Colpospira
- Species: C. runcinata

Binomial name
- Colpospira runcinata (Watson, 1881)

= Colpospira runcinata =

Species of gastropod

Colpospira runcinata is a species of sea snail, a marine gastropod mollusk in the family Turritellidae.
