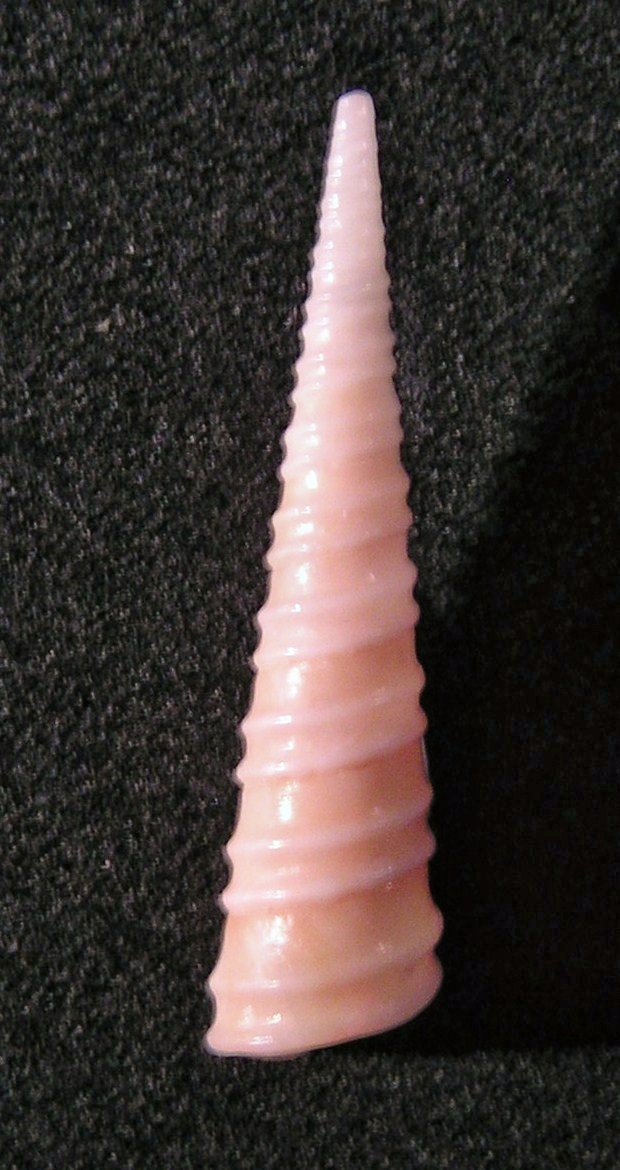
- Shell of Gazameda iredalei

Scientific classification
- Kingdom: Animalia
- Phylum: Mollusca
- Class: Gastropoda
- Subclass: Caenogastropoda
- Order: incertae sedis
- Family: Turritellidae
- Genus: Gazameda; Iredale, 1924

Type species
- Turritella gunnii Reeve, 1849

= Gazameda =

Genus of gastropods

Gazameda is a genus of sea snails, marine gastropod mollusks in the family Turritellidae.

== Species ==
Species within the genus Gazameda include:

- Gazameda gunnii (Reeve, 1849)
- Gazameda iredalei Finlay, 1927
- Gazameda madagascariensis Bozzetti, 2008
- Gazameda tasmanica (Reeve, 1849)

Species brought into synonymy

- Gazameda declivis (Adams & Reeve, 1850): synonym of Turritella declivis Adams & Reeve in Reeve, 1849
- Gazameda decoramen Iredale, 1936: synonym of Colpospira decoramen (Iredale, 1936)
- Gazameda maoria Powell, 1940: synonym of Stiracolpus pagoda (Reeve, 1849)
