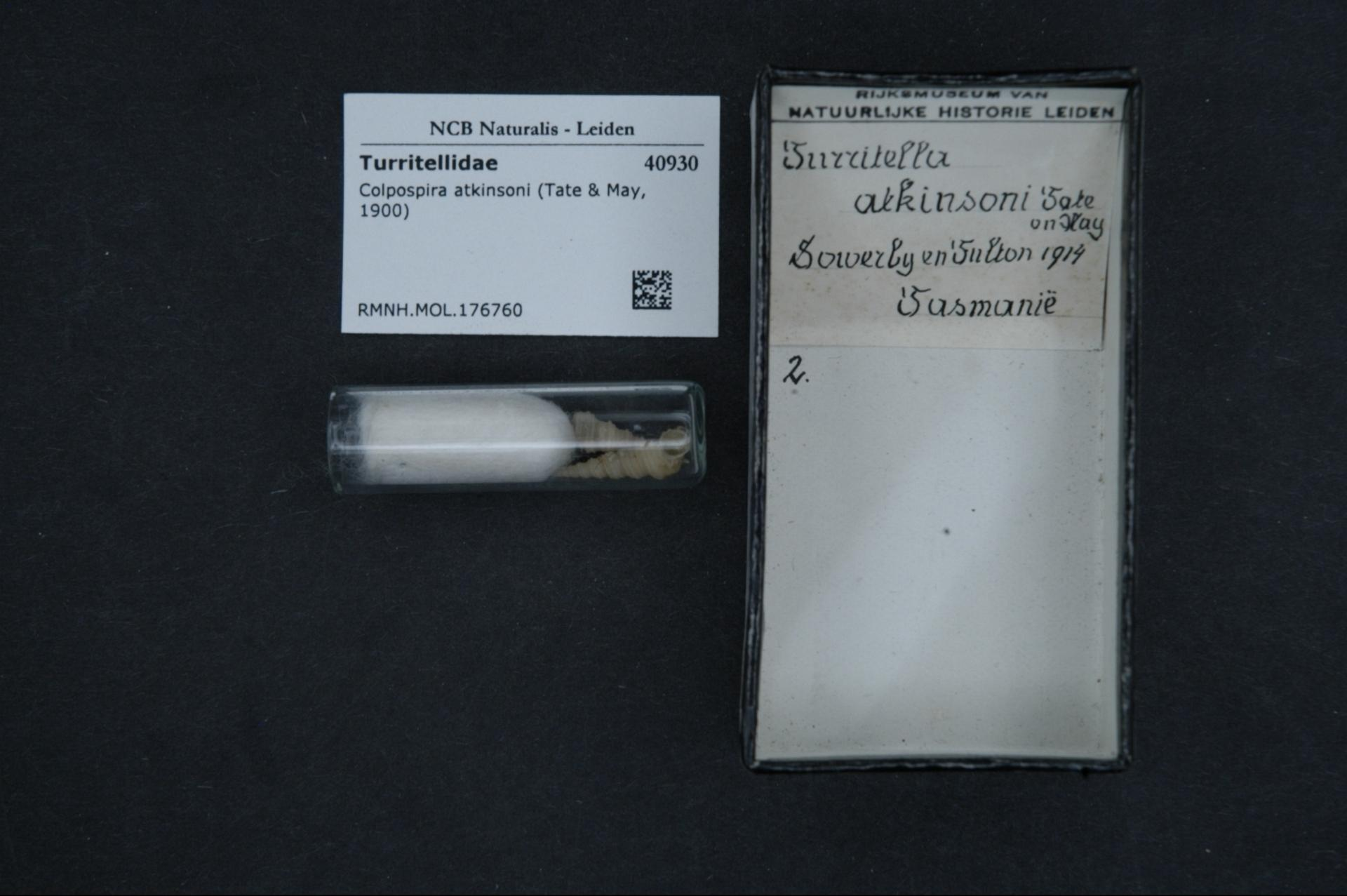
- Colpospira atkinsoni shells

Scientific classification
- Kingdom: Animalia
- Phylum: Mollusca
- Class: Gastropoda
- Subclass: Caenogastropoda
- Order: incertae sedis
- Family: Turritellidae
- Genus: Colpospira
- Species: C. atkinsoni

Binomial name
- Colpospira atkinsoni (Tate & May, 1900)

= Colpospira atkinsoni =

Species of gastropod

Colpospira atkinsoni is a species of sea snail, a marine gastropod mollusk in the family Turritellidae.
