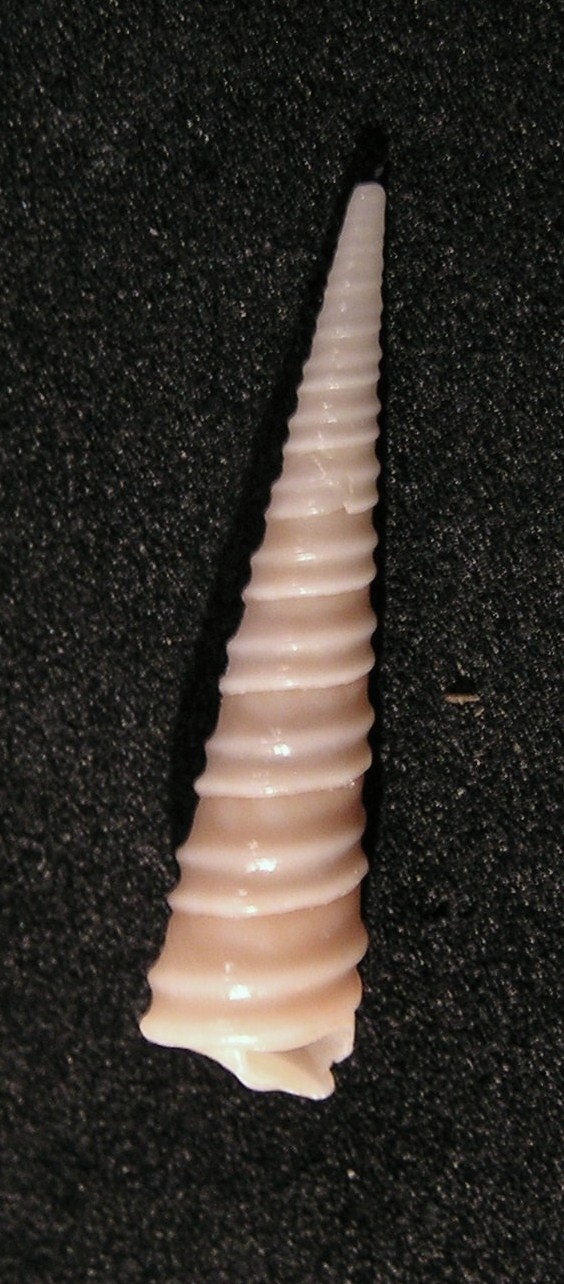
- Shell of Gazameda iredalei

Scientific classification
- Kingdom: Animalia
- Phylum: Mollusca
- Class: Gastropoda
- Subclass: Caenogastropoda
- Order: incertae sedis
- Family: Turritellidae
- Genus: Gazameda
- Species: G. iredalei

Binomial name
- Gazameda iredalei Finlay, 1927

Synonyms
- Torcula clathrata (Kiener, 1843); Turritella (Torcula) clathrata Kiener, 1843 (Alternate representation of Junior Primary Homonym – pre-occupied De Serres, 1829; supposedly pre-occupied Deshayes, 1833); Turritella (Torcula) constricta Reeve, 1849 (Recombination of synonym); Turritella clathrata Kiener, 1843 (Junior Primary Homonym – pre-occupied De Serres, 1829; supposedly pre-occupied Deshayes, 1833); Turritella constricta Reeve, 1849

= Gazameda iredalei =

Species of gastropod

Gazameda iredalei is a species of sea snail, a marine gastropod mollusk in the family Turritellidae.
