= Colpospira sophiae =

Scientific classification
- Kingdom: Animalia
- Phylum: Mollusca
- Class: Gastropoda
- Subclass: Caenogastropoda
- Order: incertae sedis
- Family: Turritellidae
- Genus: Colpospira
- Species: C. sophiae

Binomial name
- Colpospira sophiae (Brazier, 1883)

Species of gastropod

Colpospira sophiae is a species of sea snail, a marine gastropod mollusk in the family Turritellidae.
