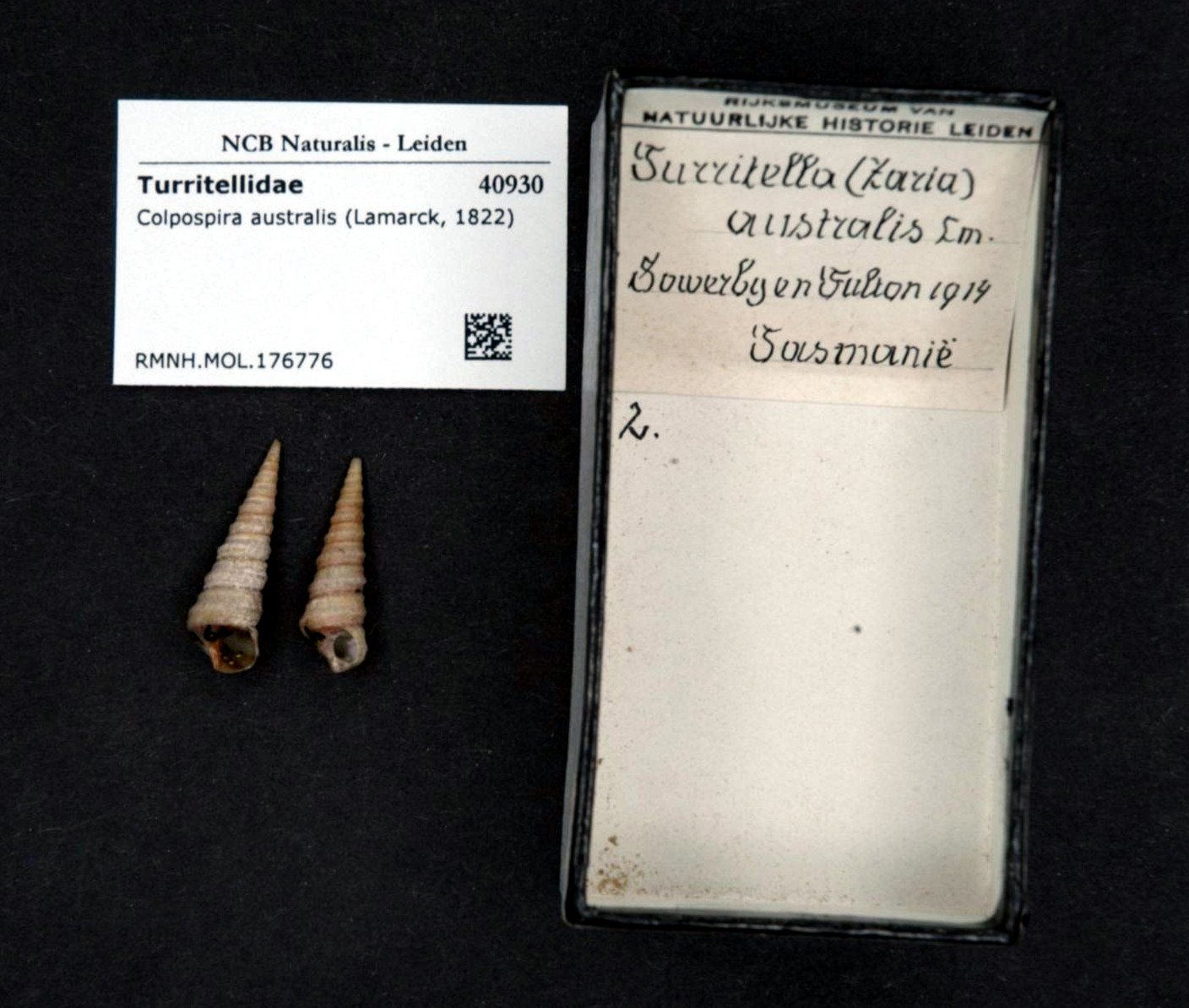
- Colpospira australis shells

Scientific classification
- Kingdom: Animalia
- Phylum: Mollusca
- Class: Gastropoda
- Subclass: Caenogastropoda
- Order: incertae sedis
- Family: Turritellidae
- Genus: Colpospira
- Species: C. australis

Binomial name
- Colpospira australis (Lamarck, 1822)

= Colpospira australis =

Species of gastropod

Colpospira australis is a species of sea snail, a marine gastropod mollusk in the family Turritellidae.
