= Tachyrhynchus erosus =

Scientific classification
- Kingdom: Animalia
- Phylum: Mollusca
- Class: Gastropoda
- Subclass: Caenogastropoda
- Order: incertae sedis
- Family: Turritellidae
- Genus: Tachyrhynchus
- Species: T. erosus

Binomial name
- Tachyrhynchus erosus (Couthouy, 1838)

Synonyms
- List: Tachyrhynchus erosus major Dall, 1919; Tachyrhynchus erosus var. major Dall, 1919; Tachyrhynchus spitzbergensis Golikov, 1986; Turritella erosa Couthouy, 1838; Turritella polaris Möller, 1842

Species of gastropod

Tachyrhynchus erosus, common name the eroded turretsnail, is a species of sea snail, a marine gastropod mollusk in the family Turritellidae.

== Description ==
The maximum recorded shell length is 35 mm.

Tachyrhynchus erosus is commonly found in sandy and muddy substrates in the Gulf of Mexico and along the southeastern coast of the United States, where it lives on the ocean floor as a benthic marine gastropod.

== Habitat ==
Minimum recorded depth is 13 m. Maximum recorded depth is 457 m.
