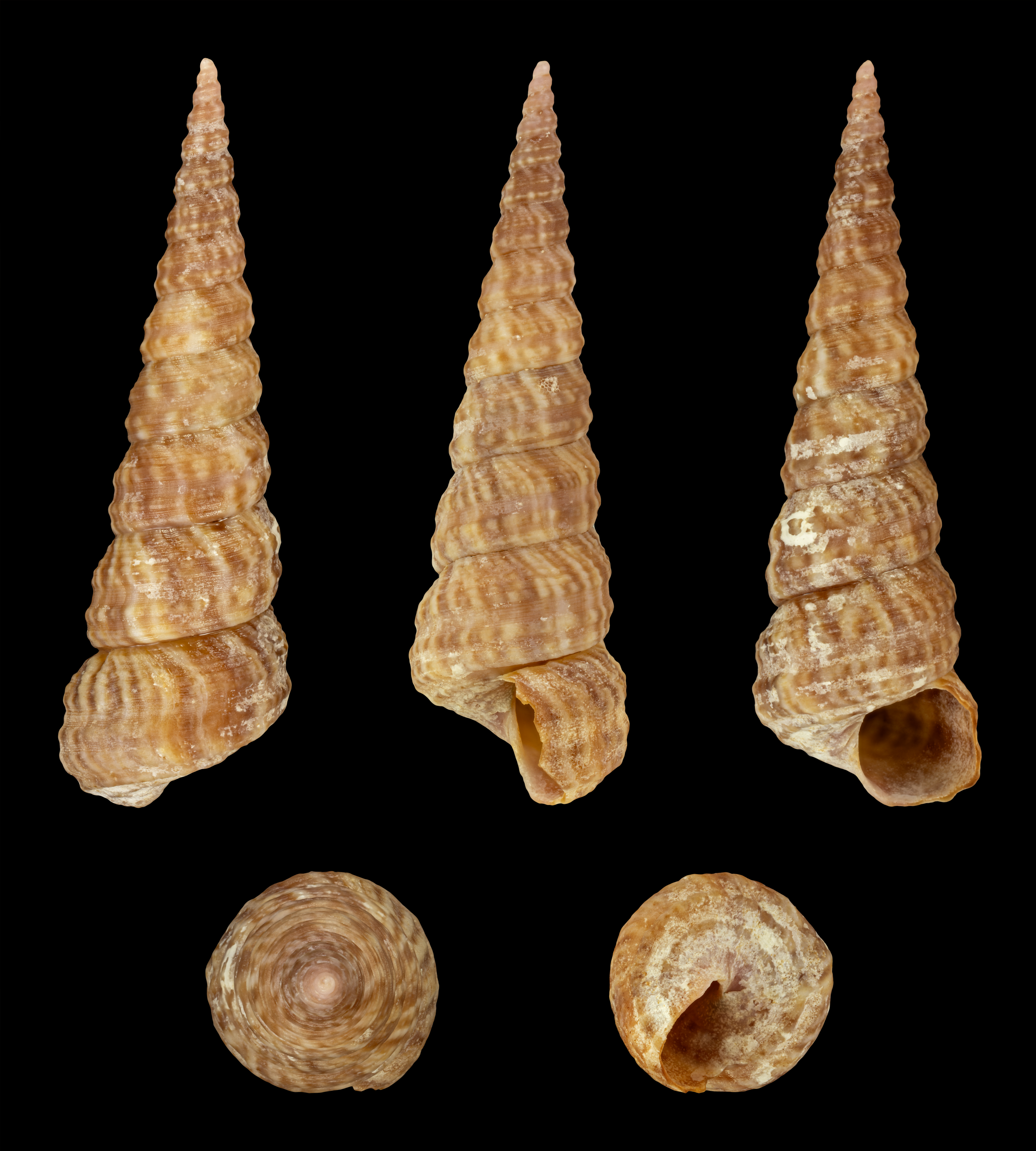
- Turritella bicingulata Lamarck, 1822

Scientific classification
- Kingdom: Animalia
- Phylum: Mollusca
- Class: Gastropoda
- Subclass: Caenogastropoda
- Order: incertae sedis
- Family: Turritellidae
- Genus: Turritella
- Species: T. bicingulata

Binomial name
- Turritella bicingulata Lamarck, 1822

Synonyms
- Archimediella bicingulata (Lamarck, 1822); Turritella biangulata Blainville, 1825

= Turritella bicingulata =

Species of gastropod

Turritella bicingulata is a species of sea snail, a marine gastropod mollusk in the family Turritellidae.

== Distribution ==
This species occurs in the Atlantic Ocean off Cape Verde, Gabon and Angola.
