= Tachyrhynchus =

Scientific classification
- Kingdom: Animalia
- Phylum: Mollusca
- Class: Gastropoda
- Subclass: Caenogastropoda
- Order: incertae sedis
- Family: Turritellidae
- Subfamily: Turritellinae
- Genus: Tachyrhynchus; Mörch, 1875

Synonyms
- Tachyrhinchus; Tachyrynchus Mörch, 1868

Genus of gastropods

Tachyrhynchus is a genus of sea snails, marine gastropod mollusks in the family Turritellidae.

== Species ==
The following species are recognised in the genus Tachyrhynchus:

- Tachyrhynchus erosus (Couthouy, 1838)
- †Tachyrhynchus ilpiskensis Titova, 1993
- †Tachyrhynchus importunus (Yokoyama, 1924)
- Tachyrhynchus lacteolus (P. P. Carpenter, 1864)
- Tachyrhynchus nomurai (Ozaki, 1958)
- †Tachyrhynchus plicatus Titova, 1993
- †Tachyrhynchus podkagernensis Titova, 1994
- Tachyrhynchus reticulatus (Mighels & C. B. Adams, 1842)
- Tachyrhynchus stearnsii Dall, 1919
- †Tachyrhynchus tuberculosus (Yokoyama, 1927)
- Tachyrhynchus urashimanus (Nomura & Niino, 1940)
- Tachyrhynchus ventricosus Golikov, 1986
- †Tachyrhynchus venustellus (Yokoyama, 1927)
- †Tachyrhynchus yamaokaensis Itoigawa & Shibata, 1976
- Tachyrhynchus yanamii (Yokoyama, 1926)
