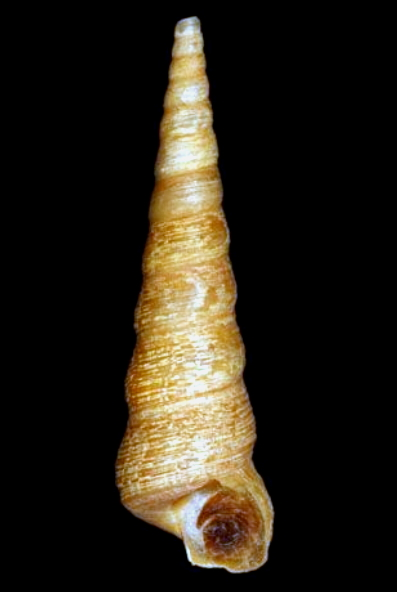
- Shell of Neohaustator andenensis (specimen at the Natural History Museum, Rotterdamà

Scientific classification
- Kingdom: Animalia
- Phylum: Mollusca
- Class: Gastropoda
- Subclass: Caenogastropoda
- Order: incertae sedis
- Family: Turritellidae
- Genus: Neohaustator; Ida, 1952

= Neohaustator =

Genus of gastropods

Neohaustator is a genus of sea snails, marine gastropod mollusks in the family Turritellidae.

== Species ==
Species within the genus Neohaustator include:

- Neohaustator andenensis (Otuka, 1934)
- Neohaustator fortilirata (G. B. Sowerby III, 1914)
