= George Blundell Longstaff =

British politician and entomologist

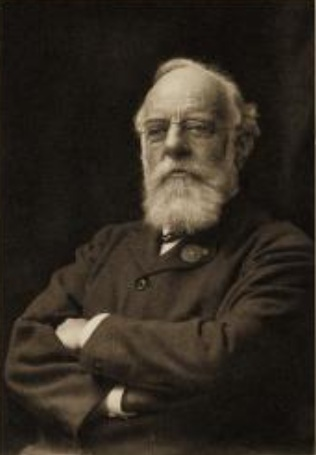
- Born: 2 February 1849; London, England
- Died: 7 May 1921 (aged 72); Wimbledon, London, England
- Burial place: Putney Vale Cemetery
- Education: New College, Oxford; St. Thomas's Hospital
- Spouse(s): Sara Leam Dixon; Jane Longstaff

George Blundell Longstaff (2 February 1849 – 7 May 1921) was a British politician, amateur entomologist, and nonfiction writer. He was a representative on the London County Council.

== Early life ==
Longstaff was born on 2 February 1849. he was the second son of Maria Blundell and George Dixon Longstaff, a physician in Wandsworth. He was educated at Rugby School.

He graduated from New College, Oxford in 1871 with a first-class B.A. degree in natural science. An interest in entomology, specifically lepidopterology, was sparked at an early age, influenced by his uncle William Spence. However, he lost an eye in an accident during his second term at Oxford however put an end to his entomology studies for many years.

He studied medicine at St. Thomas's Hospital, obtaining a Mead Medal and receiving a B.M. in 1876. He received a Doctor of Public Health degree in 1877. He received an MA DM FRCP and MRCS post graduate diplomas in 1888.

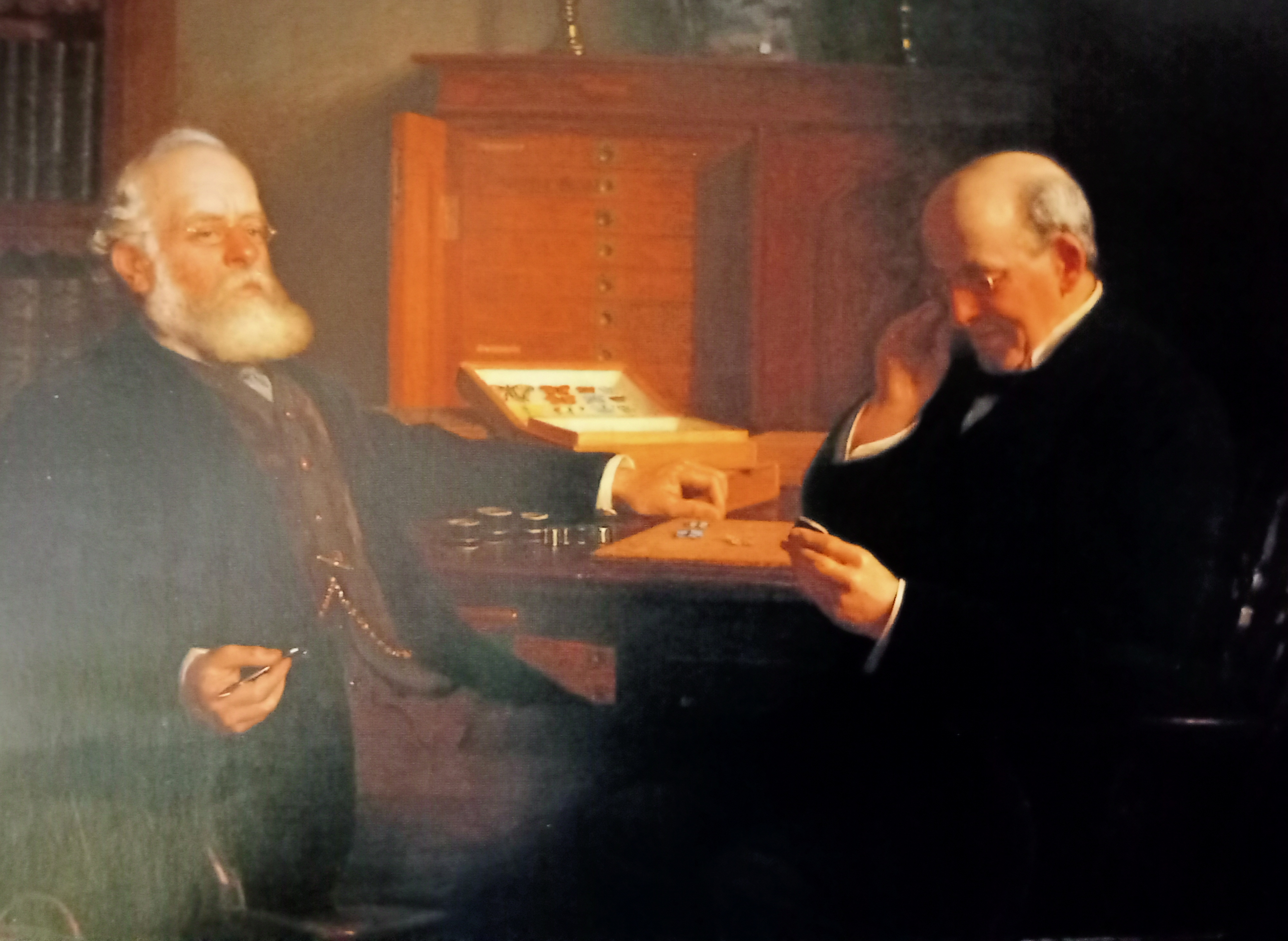
The Aurelians (1900), painted by John Cooke (1866-1932), depicting Longstaff (left) with Selwyn Image

== Career ==
Longstaff never practiced medicine, but instead devoted his life to municipal, scientific, and philanthropic work. For fourteen years, Longstaff was the representative for the London Borough of Wandsworth in the London County Council. In this capacity, he was chairman of the Building Act Committee. He was also a justice of the peace, served on the Wandsworth District Board of Works, and was a Poor Law guardian. He was a member and chairman of the Wandsworth Library Commissioners, following his father, who was the group's first chair.

Longstaff took an interest in demographic statistics and wrote several publications, including Studies in Statistics, Social, Political, and Medical (1891). He revived his interest in entomology during a trip through India and Sri Lanka in 1903 to 1904, accompanied by his second wife. He wrote a book Butterfly Hunting in Many Lands (1912). He collected some 14,000 specimens which were donated to the Hope collection at Oxford.

He was vice president of the Royal Statistical Society and the Royal Entomological Society. He was a fellow of the Linnean Society of London, the Geological Society of London, and the Royal Entomological Society.

During World War I, Longstaff volunteered as the chief inspector of the Wandsworth section from 1914 to 1917, resigning due to poor health.

== Personal life ==
Longstaff married Sara Leam Dixon of Southampton in 1875. They had two sons and two daughters. In 1906, he married his second wife, the geologist Mary Jane Donald.

He was active with the Charity Organisation Society for more than thirty years, serving as chairman for the Wandsworth committee.

Longstaff died at his home Highlands in Putney Heath, Wimbleton, London on 7 May 1921, after a long illness. He was buried in Putney Vale Cemetery. He donated £1000 to the Entomological Society before his death.

== Publications ==
=== Articles ===
- "The Recent Decline in the English Death-Rate Considered in Connection with the Causes of Death". Journal of the Statistical Society of London vol. 47, no. 2 (June 1884), pp. 221-258. doi:10.2307/2979188.
- "Suggestions for the Census of 1891". Journal of the Royal Stattistical Society vol. 52, no. 3 (September 1889), pp. 436-467. doi:10.2307/2979139.
- "Rural Depopulation". Journal of the Royal Statistical Society, vol. 56, no. 3 (September 1893), pp. 380-433. doi:10.1111/j.2397-2335.1893.tb02562.x.
- "The Present Population of the Uinited Kingdom, 5th April, 1896". Journal of the Royal Statistical Society vol. 59, no. 2 (June 1896), pp. 387-392. doi:10.1111/j.2397-2335.1896.tb02705.x

=== Books ===
- Studies in Statistics, Social, Political, and Medical. London: Edward Stanford, 1891.
- The Langstaffs of Teesdale and Weardale. Materials for a History of a Yeoman Family. London: Mitchell Hughes & Clarke, 1906.
- Butterfly-Hunting in Many Lands; Notes of a Field Naturalist. London: Longmans, Green, and Co., 1912.
