= Spirocolpus =

Scientific classification
- Kingdom: Animalia
- Phylum: Mollusca
- Class: Gastropoda
- Subclass: Caenogastropoda
- Order: incertae sedis
- Superfamily: Cerithioidea
- Family: Turritellidae
- Genus: †Spirocolpus; Finlay, 1926

Type species
- † Turritella waihaoensis Marwick, 1924

Species
- See text

Extinct genus of gastropods

Spirocolpus is a genus of sea snails, marine gastropod mollusks in the family Turritellidae.

== Species ==
Species within the genus Spirocolpus include:

- † Spirocolpus carsoni Finlay & Marwick, 1937
- † Spirocolpus meadii (Baily, 1855)
- † Spirocolpus rudis (P. Marshall, 1919)
- † Spirocolpus tophinus (Marwick, 1926)
- † Spirocolpus waihaoensis (Marwick, 1924)
