= Orectospira =

Scientific classification
- Kingdom: Animalia
- Phylum: Mollusca
- Class: Gastropoda
- Subclass: Caenogastropoda
- Order: incertae sedis
- Family: Turritellidae
- Genus: Orectospira; Dall, 1925

Genus of gastropods

Orectospira is a genus of sea snails, marine gastropod mollusks in the family Turritellidae.

== Species ==
Species within the genus Orectospira include:

- Orectospira babelica (Dall, 1907)
- Orectospira shikoensis (Yokoyama, 1928)
- Orectospira tectiformis (Watson, 1880)

Species brought into synonymy

- Orectospira fusca Okutani & Habe, 1981: synonym of Mathilda fusca (Okutani & Habe, 1981)
