= Turritella dirkhartogensis =

Scientific classification
- Kingdom: Animalia
- Phylum: Mollusca
- Class: Gastropoda
- Subclass: Caenogastropoda
- Order: incertae sedis
- Family: Turritellidae
- Genus: Turritella
- Species: T. dirkhartogensis

Binomial name
- Turritella dirkhartogensis (Garrard, 1972)

Species of gastropod

Turritella dirkhartogensis is a species of sea snail, a marine gastropod mollusk in the family Turritellidae.
