= Turritellenplatte =

Outcrop of fossil-bearing marine sedimentary rock near Ulm, Germany

Coordinates: 48.389°N 9.893°E

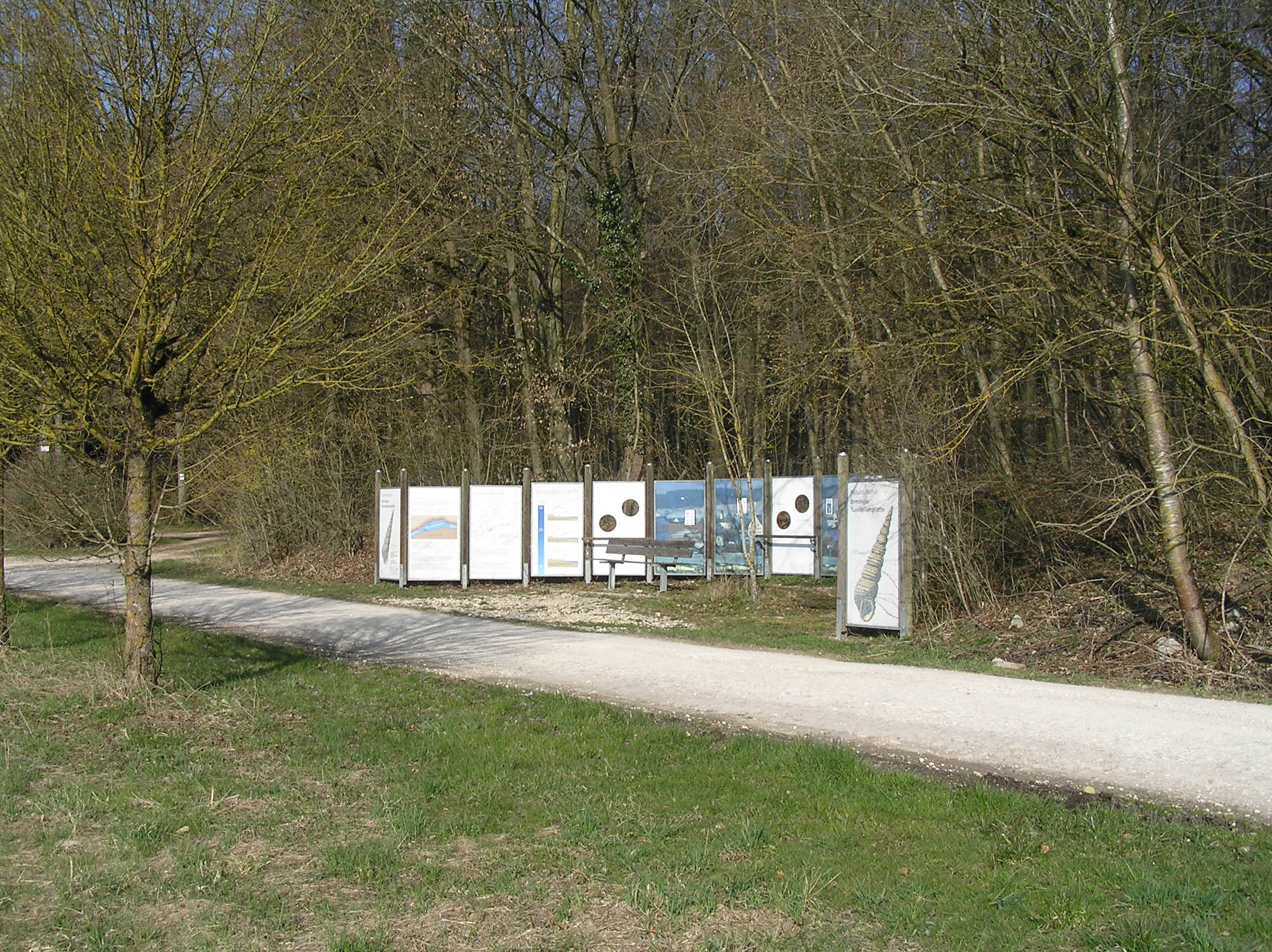
Erminger Turritellenplatte

The Turritellenplatte of Ermingen ("Erminger Turritellenplatte" near Ulm, Germany) is a type of very rich, fossil-bearing rock which is of particular interest to geologists and paleontologists. It occurs in a very restricted outcrop and is protected in its entirety as a natural monument.

This outcrop of these marine sedimentary rocks is situated in the northern part of the North Alpine Foreland Basin (NAFB) and it is famous for a superabundance of shells of the sea snail Turritella turris, a marine gastropod mollusk in the family Turritellidae. The fauna of this gastropod-rich sandstone reflects mainly near-coastal and shallow marine conditions. Petrographical and palaeontological data allow a correlation of the Turritellenplatte of Ermingen with Burdigalian (Lower Miocene). The Sr-isotope composition of shark teeth in the deposit suggests an age of about 18.5 million years for the Turritellenplatte of Ermingen.
