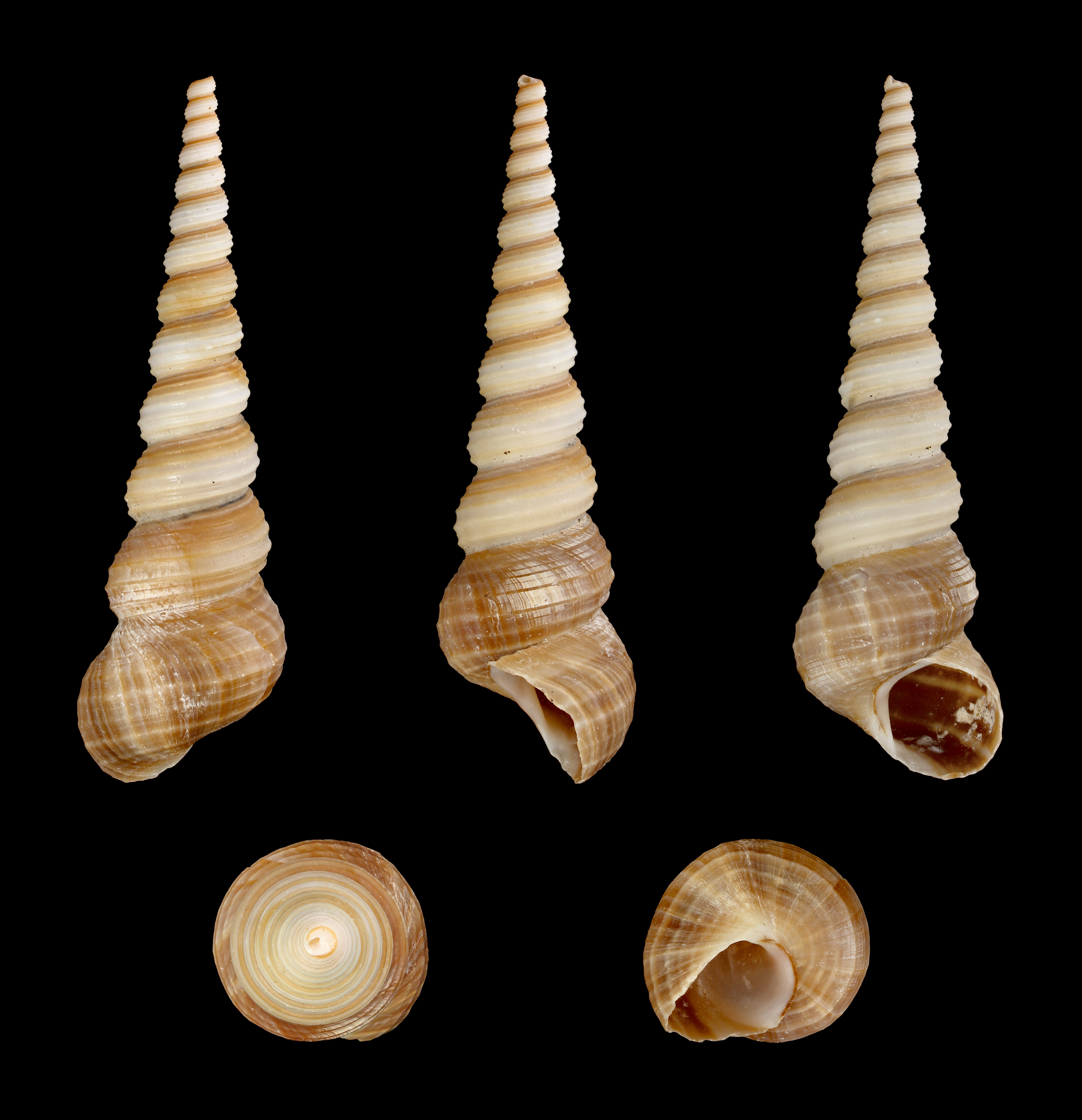

Scientific classification
- Kingdom: Animalia
- Phylum: Mollusca
- Class: Gastropoda
- Subclass: Caenogastropoda
- Order: incertae sedis
- Family: Turritellidae
- Genus: Turritella
- Species: T. terebra

Binomial name
- Turritella terebra (Linnaeus, 1758)

Synonyms
- Turbo terebra Linnaeus, 1758

= Turritella terebra =

Species of gastropod

Turritella terebra is a species of sea snail, a marine gastropod mollusk in the family Turritellidae.

== Description ==
The shell of Turritella terebra, has a long tower-like shape which resembles a drill, hence its name. The shell is narrow and tall, with as many as 30 whorls. The shell is about 14 centimeters long. Its color is light to dark brown. The opening is circular.

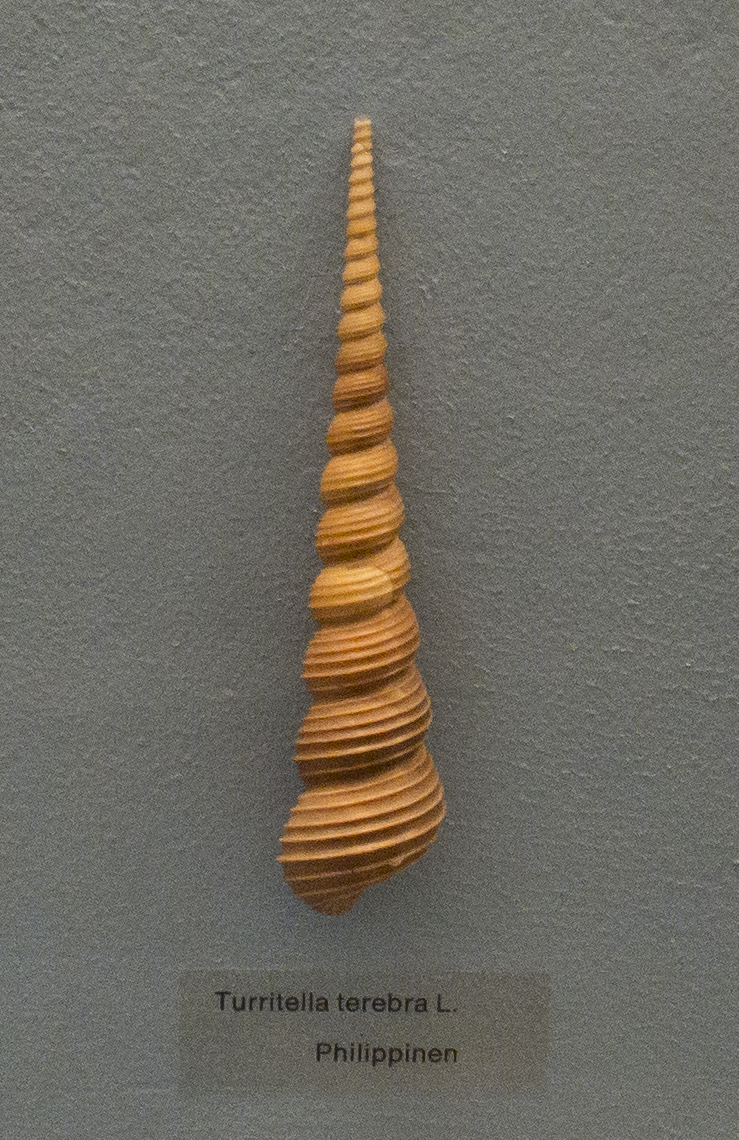
Shell of Turritella terebra

== Distribution ==
The species is native to the Indo-West Pacific region.
