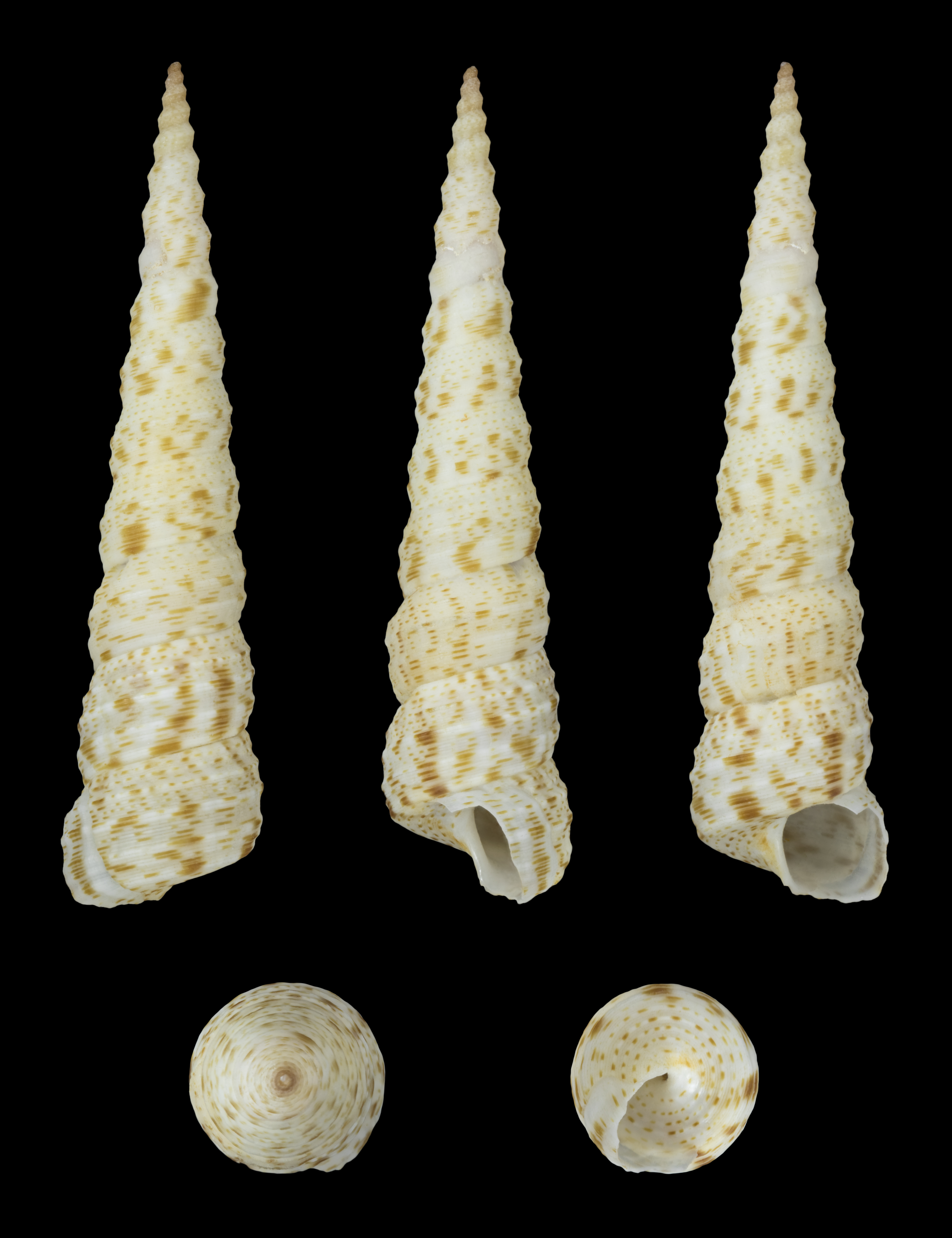

Scientific classification
- Kingdom: Animalia
- Phylum: Mollusca
- Class: Gastropoda
- Subclass: Caenogastropoda
- Order: incertae sedis
- Family: Turritellidae
- Genus: Turritella
- Species: T. maculata

Binomial name
- Turritella maculata Reeve, 1849

Synonyms
- Archimediella maculata (Reeve, 1849); Turritella (Haustator) maculata Reeve, 1849; Turritella (Haustator) vittulata Adams & Reeve, 1850; Turritella (Torcula) admirabilis R. B. Watson, 1881 (Original combination); Turritella admirabilis R. B. Watson, 1881; Turritella bicolor Adams & Reeve in Reeve, 1849; Turritella maculata var. chionia Melvill, 1928 (Colour variety); Turritella vittulata Adams & Reeve in Reeve, 1849

= Turritella maculata =

Species of gastropod

Turritella maculata is a species of sea snail, a marine gastropod mollusk in the family Turritellidae.

== Description ==
The length of the shell varies between 30 mm and 10 mm.

== Distribution ==
The marine species occurs off Australia; in the Indian Ocean and in the Red Sea.
