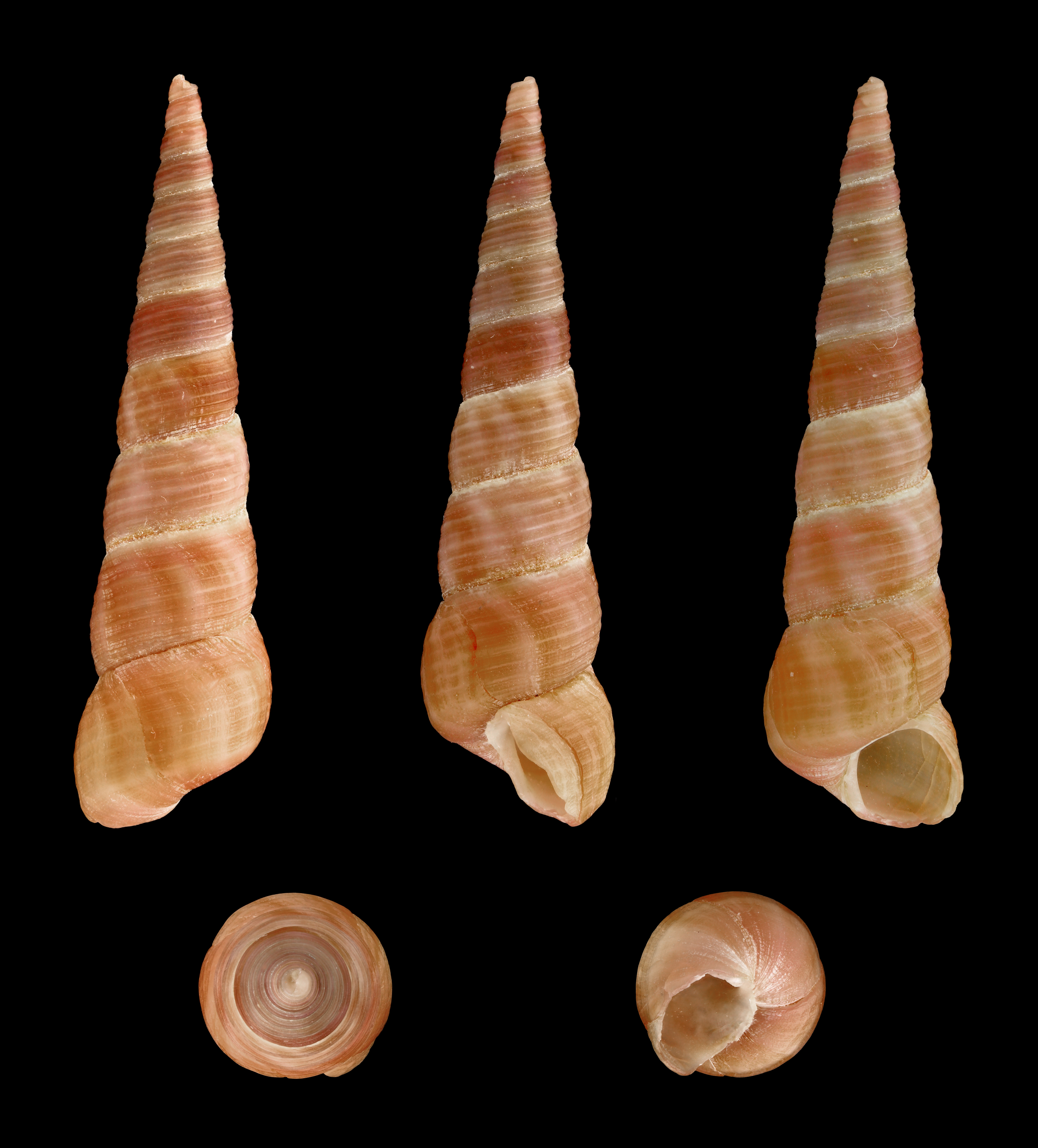
- Five views of a shell of Turritella communis
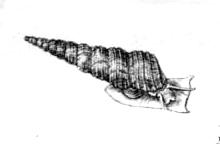
- A drawing of a live individual of Turritella communis

Scientific classification
- Kingdom: Animalia
- Phylum: Mollusca
- Class: Gastropoda
- Subclass: Caenogastropoda
- Order: incertae sedis
- Family: Turritellidae
- Genus: Turritella
- Species: T. communis

Binomial name
- Turritella communis Risso, 1826

= Turritella communis =

Species of gastropod

Turritella communis, common name the "common tower shell" is a species of medium-sized sea snails with an operculum, marine gastropod mollusks in the family Turritellidae.

== Distribution and habitat ==
This species occurs in the Eastern Atlantic Ocean from the Lofoten Isles south to the Mediterranean Sea and North Africa. It is rare or absent from the eastern English Channel and the southern North Sea. This tower shell can be found in the sublittoral zone to depths up to 200 m, where it is usually found burrowed in gravelly mud at an angle of about 10°. There it remains stationary for long periods. It can be locally abundant on muddy sediment in shallow waters.

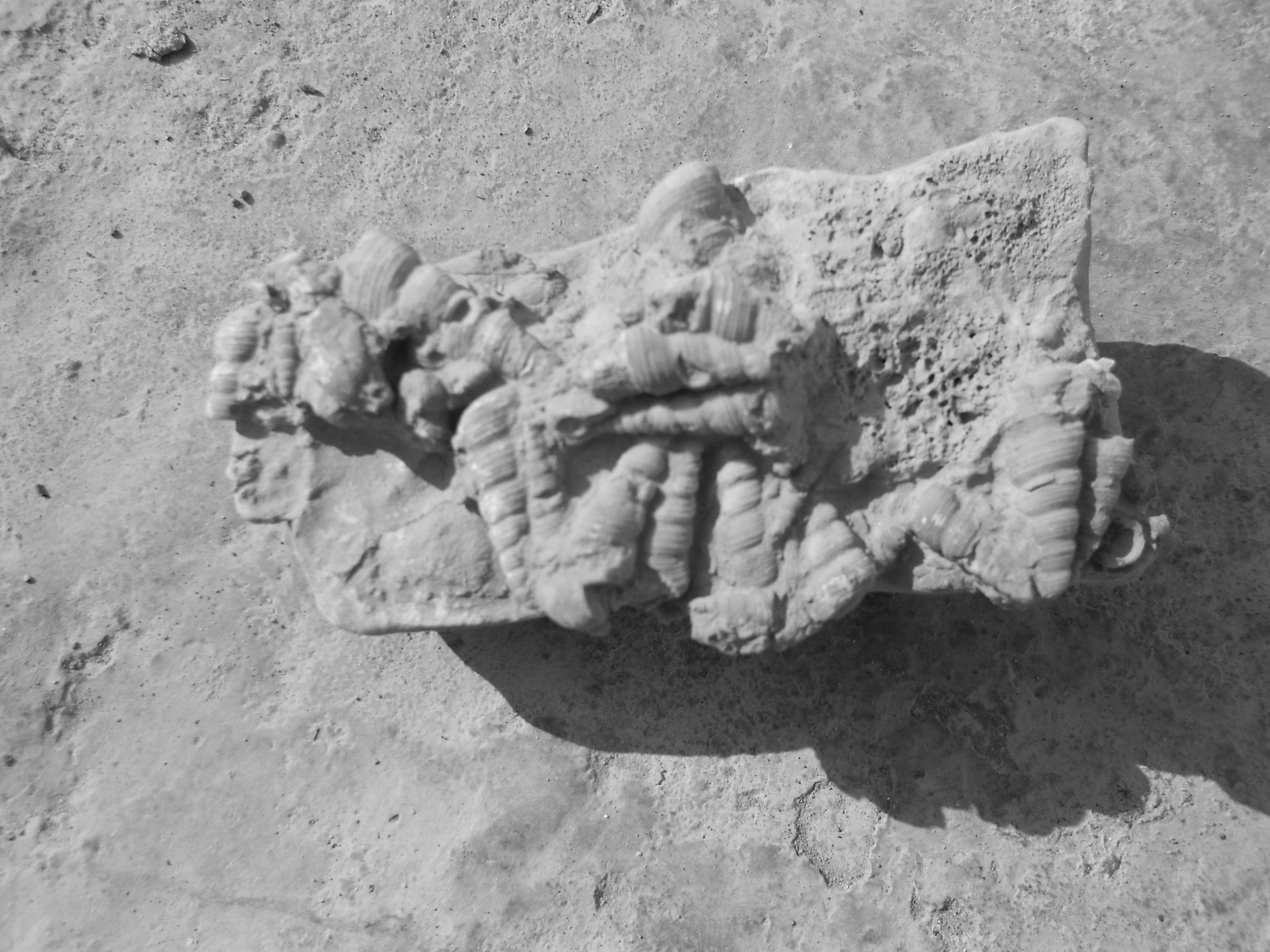
Turritella communis fossils

Fossil and subfossil shells of Turritella communis have been found in interglacial strata in the North Sea, from the Late Pliocene to the Quaternary Period.

== Description ==
The tall, conical shell is brownish-yellow to white. It is sharply pointed and contains 16-20 enlarged whorls. The spiral ridges are numerous (with 3 - 6 more prominent) and may have a beaded appearance. The shell grows to a length of 3 cm and may become 1 cm wide. The angulate shell aperture is small. The outer lip is crenulate. There is no umbilicus. The concave operculum is small and circular and has numerous pinnate bristles on its edges.

The snail shows white markings on the tentacles, siphon and foot. This small foot shows dark spots and streaks.

== Feeding habits ==
Turritella communis feeds on deposits through ciliary feeding. In order to prevent larger particles entering the mantle cavity, it possesses at the mantle edge a curtain of tentacles of which the larger ones are pinnate.
