= Whorl (mollusc) =

Complete revolution in the shell of a mollusc

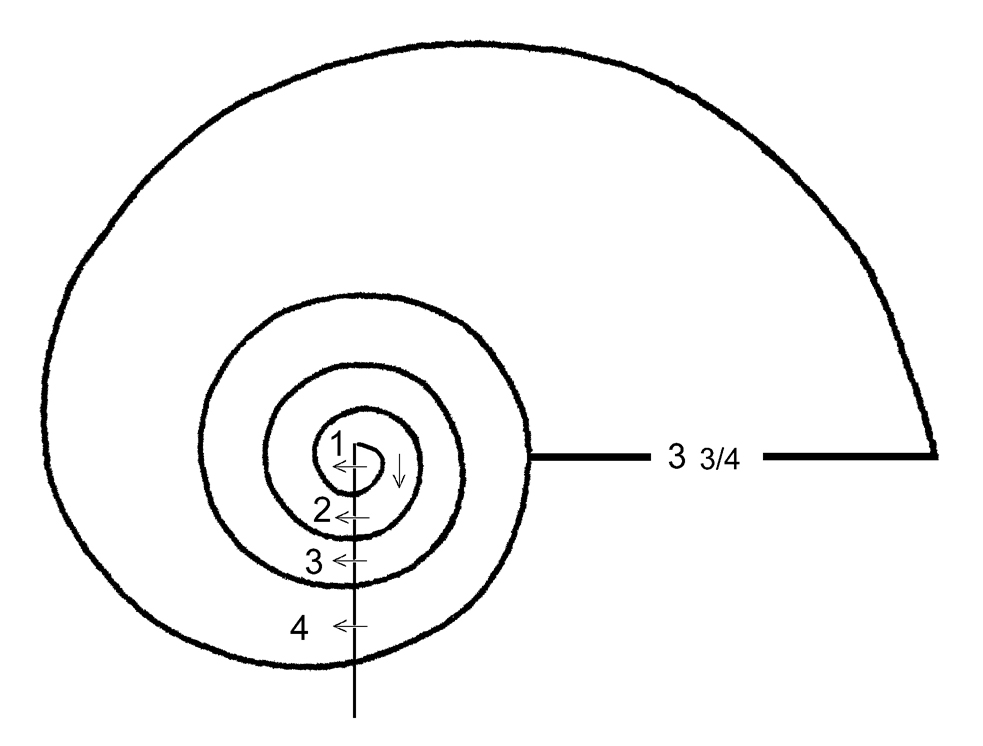
Counting gastropod whorls. In this example a shell with 3¾ whorls is shown, with the fourth whorl expanding more rapidly than whorls 1–3.

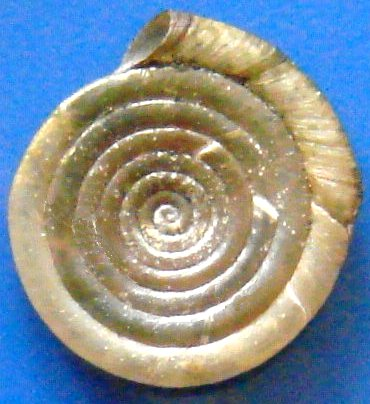
View of the spire side of the planispiral shell of the freshwater snail Anisus septemgyratus. This shell has seven and a half whorls

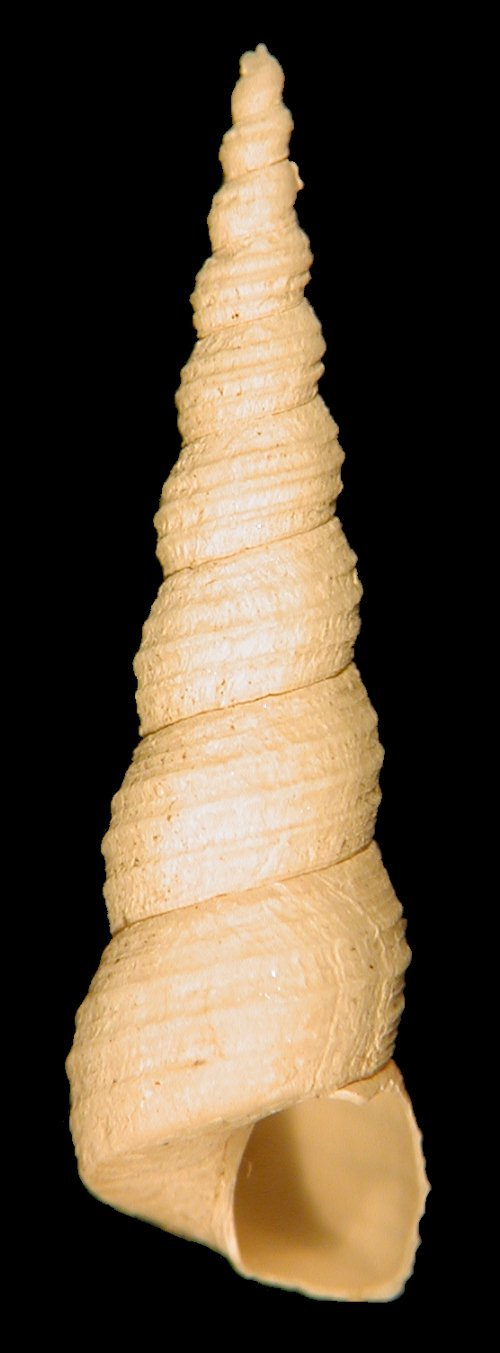
A fossil shell of the marine gastropod Turritella communis. This shell has nine whorls

A whorl is a single, complete 360° revolution or turn in the spiral or whorled growth of a mollusc shell. A spiral configuration is found in the shells of numerous gastropods, and in shelled cephalopods including Nautilus, Spirula and the large extinct subclass of cephalopods known as the ammonites.

A spiral shell can be visualized as consisting of a long conical tube, the growth of which is coiled into an overall helical or planispiral shape, for reasons of strength and compactness.

The number of whorls in an adult shell of a particular species depends on mathematical factors in geometric growth, as described in D'Arcy Wentworth Thompson's classic 1917 book On Growth and Form, and by David Raup. The main factor is how rapidly the conical tube expands (or flares) over time. When the rate of expansion is low, such that each subsequent whorl is not that much wider than the previous one, then the adult shell has numerous whorls. When the mathematical factors governing the pattern of growth are such that the conical diameter expands, then the adult shell has few whorls.

The number of whorls present in an adult shell differs by taxa. The extant marine gastropod families Turritellidae and Terebridae, and the extinct Mesozoic family Nerineidae, have high spired shells with many whorls and a relatively small aperture.

The shells of a few genera of gastropods, and of the cephalopod genus Spirula, have whorls that are disconnected.

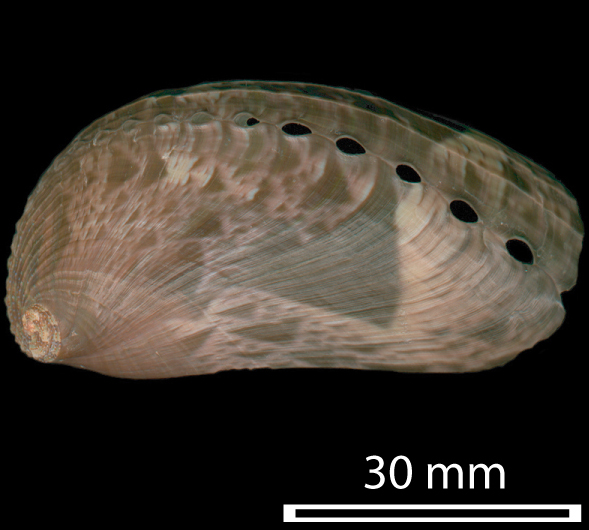
The shell of the marine gastropod Haliotis asinina has fewer than two whorls

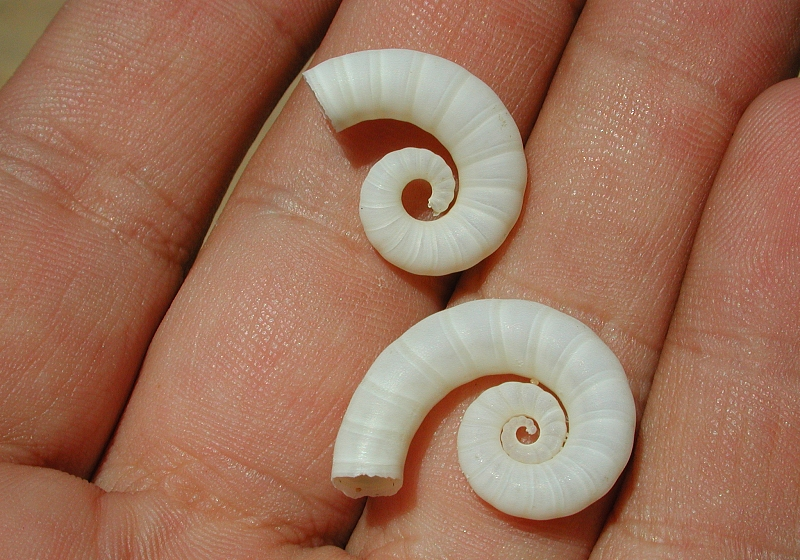
The shell of Spirula spirula has disconnected whorls

== Counting ==
To count exactly the number of whorls in gastropods a straight line is drawn to separate the semi-circular nucleus (protoconch (1 - see image) from the younger part of the shell. An arrow placed at a 90° angle on this line, following the course of the whorl, reaches the end of the first whorl where it is parallel to its starting position. From that point all whorls are counted towards the margin of the shell, estimating the ultimate whorl with an accuracy of a quarter whorl.

Other methods have been proposed. increasing whorl counts by one-fourth.

== Terminology ==
- Apical whorls—the whorls near the apex or tip of the shell
- Body whorl—The most recently formed whorl, in which most of the body of the animal is found
- Nuclear whorl(s)—small, generally smooth whorls formed within the egg, and constituting the apex of the shell
- Protoconch—a larval shell of a mollusc; also refers to protoconch whorls of an adult shell
- Teleoconch—whorls beyond the protoconch
- Nepionic whorls : the whorls immediately following the embryonic whorls.
