= Jane Longstaff =

British malacologist (1855–1935)

- Born: 27 August 1855; Carlisle, Cumberland, England
- Died: 19 January 1935 (aged 79); Bath, Somerset, England
- Known for: fossil snails expert
- Scientific career
- Fields: malacology

Mary Jane Longstaff, FLS, FGS (née Donald; 27 August 1855 – 19 January 1935) was a British malacologist, specialising in fossil gastropods of the Palaeozoic.

== Early life ==
Mary Jane Donald was born in 1855 in Carlisle. She was the eldest child of Matthew Hodgson Donald, a prominent local industrialist, and his wife Henrietta Maria Roper. She had three younger siblings. She was sent to a private girls' school in London, and then attended the Carlisle School of Art. Although she never had any formal scientific education, she was interested in nature from a very early age, and particularly in snails and other land and freshwater molluscs.

== Scientific work ==
Donald educated herself. Her first paper on molluscs was read before a local scientific organisation in Cumberland in 1881. J. G. Goodchild, a British Geological Survey expert on northern British geology who was a member of this organisation, suggested that Donald undertake a study of some neglected groups of fossil shells.

She subsequently published nineteen more papers on fossil gastropods, starting with some on the local fossils of Cumberland in 1885. Given how neglected her field was, she realized a large-scale taxonomic revision was necessary, and she devoted decades to such a study, published in a series of papers in the Quarterly Journal of the Geological Society, of which the last instalment was published during 1933. She was one of the few experts who could work on the gastropod fossils found by the Scottish fossil collector Elizabeth Gray. Because so few papers have been published on the taxa she studied, her taxonomic work remains relevant to the present day.

As a woman, Donald could not be employed by or formally affiliated with any particular museum, limiting her access to fossil collections and scientific communication. She had to visit various museums and travel around Britain for this purpose. Given such limitations, her thorough, meticulous papers were remarkable achievements, and she also showed some skill as a scientific illustrator in all the figures in her papers. She became a member of the Geological Society of London in 1883, and at the time of her death she was one of the longest-standing members. In 1889, she received the Murchison Fund Award, an award for achievements by researchers under the age of 40. Donald was one of twelve women who presented papers at the women's section of the geological congress, as a part of the World's Congress Auxiliary of the World's Columbian Exposition in Chicago, in August 1893.

In 1906, she was elected a Fellow of the Linnean Society. In addition to her malacological work, she had some interest in botany.

In August 1906, she married widower George Blundell Longstaff, a prominent lepidopterist and statistician. They travelled on collecting expeditions overseas together, to northern and southern Africa, Australia, the British West Indies, and South America, George collecting butterflies and Jane Longstaff collecting molluscs. Based on her collections in the tropics, she published a number of papers and appendices to her husband's books, most notably one on the freshwater and land molluscs of the southern Sudan. She also took home some large land snails of the species Achatina zebra, and published a paper on their habits in captivity in 1921.

== Later life ==
Her husband died in 1921, after several years of ill health. Jane Longstaff died at Bath, on 19 January 1935. After her death, her collections passed to her nephew, who donated them to the British Museum (Natural History).
