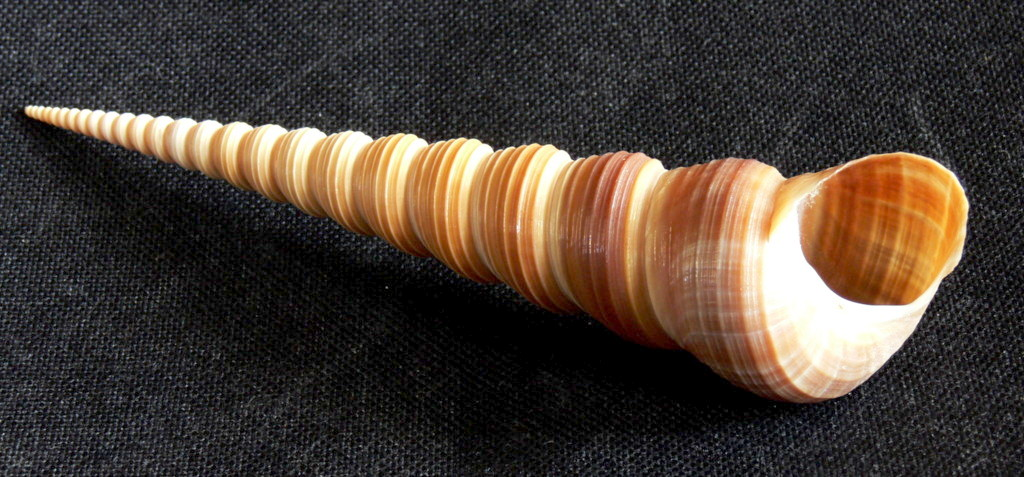
- A shell of a Turritella terebra

Scientific classification
- Kingdom: Animalia
- Phylum: Mollusca
- Class: Gastropoda
- Subclass: Caenogastropoda
- Order: incertae sedis
- Superfamily: Cerithioidea
- Family: Turritellidae; Lovén, 1847

Genera
- See text

Diversity
- 26 extant genera 143 extant species

Synonyms
- Archimediellidae Starobogatov, 1982; Zariinae Gray, 1850

= Turritellidae =

Family of gastropods

Turritellidae, with the common name tower shells or tower snails, is a taxonomic family of small- to medium-sized sea snails, marine gastropod molluscs in the Sorbeoconcha clade.

They are filter feeders; this method of feeding is somewhat unusual among gastropod mollusks, but is very common in bivalves.

== Shell description ==
The shells of turritellid species have whorls that are more convex and their apertures being more circular than it is in the auger shells, which are similarly high-spired. The columella is curved and the thin operculum has many horns.

== Anatomy of the soft parts ==
These snails burrow into mud or sand, with their feet being relatively small.

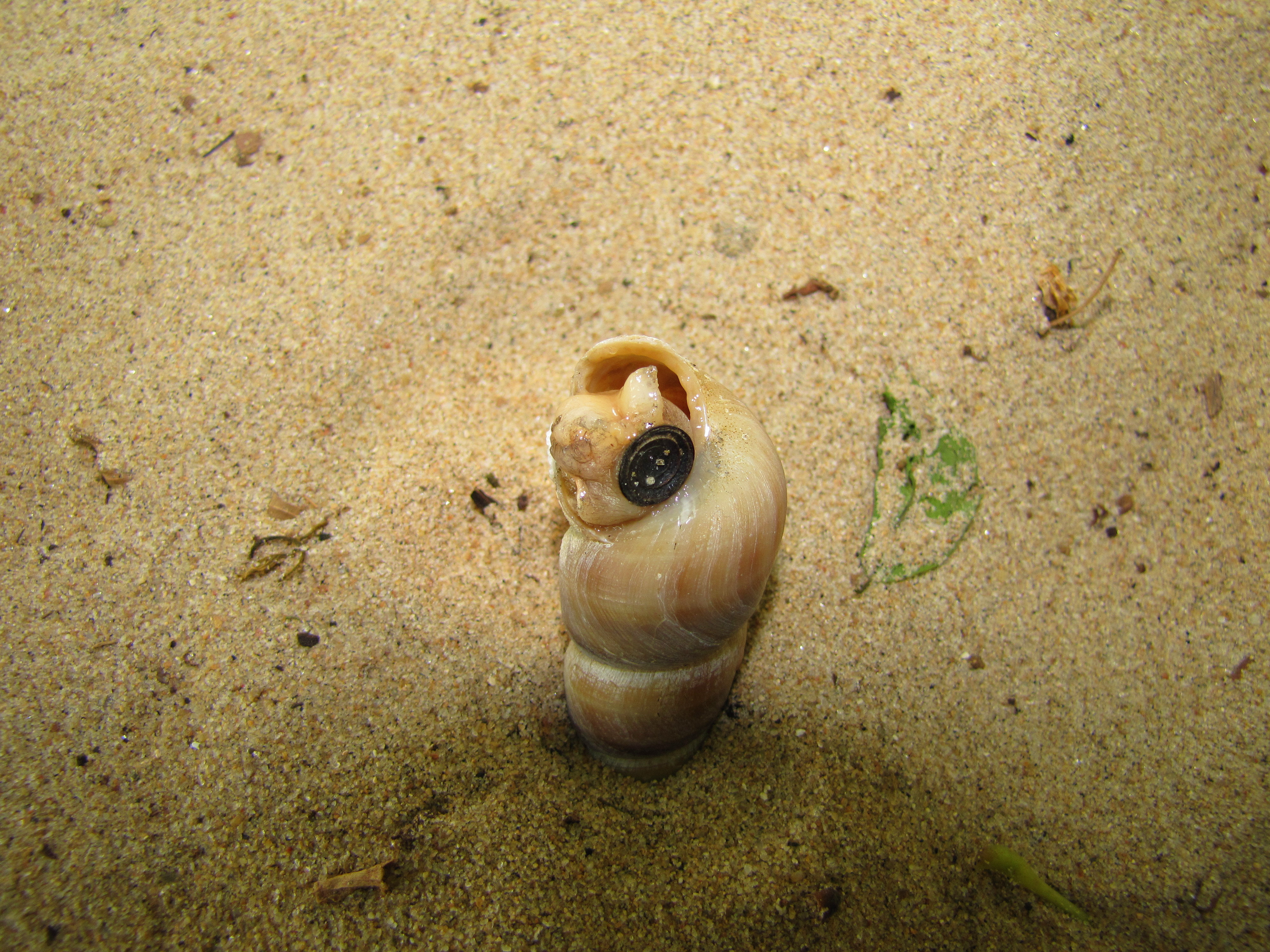
A medium-sized sea snail in a genus India

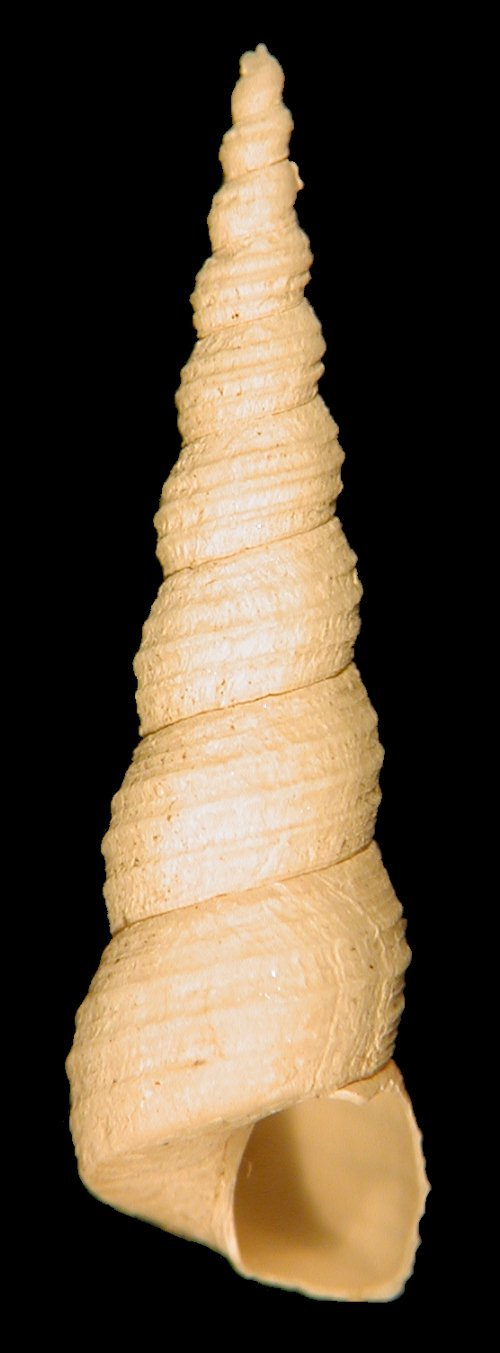
A fossil shell of Turritella communis from a deep borehole in the Netherlands

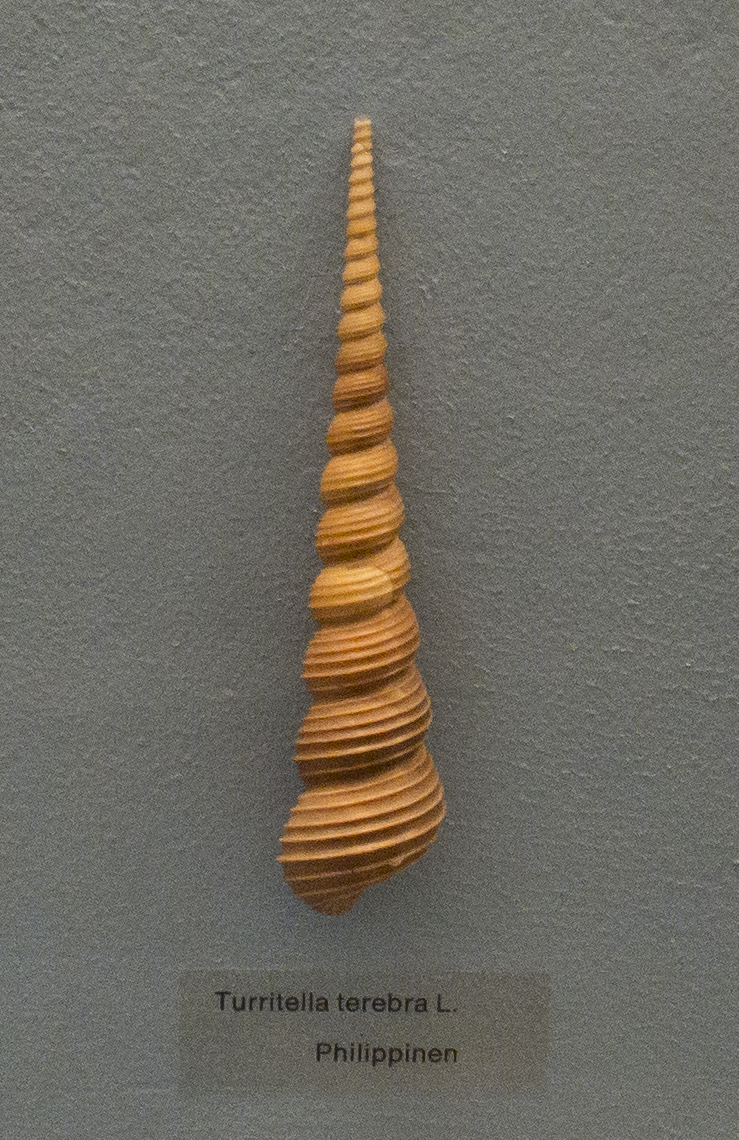
Turritella terebra shell on display.

== Taxonomy ==
The following genera are recognised in the family Turritellidae:

†Omalaxinae

- †Omalaxis Deshayes, 1832

Orectospirinae

- Orectospira Dall, 1925

Pareorinae

- †Batillona Finlay, 1927
- †Eligmostoma Cossmann, 1888
- Mesalia Gray, 1847
- Pareora Marwick, 1931
- †Sigmesalia H. J. Finlay & Marwick, 1937

Protominae

- †Allmonia Harzhauser & Landau, 2019
- Protoma Baird, 1870

Turritellinae

- Archimediella Sacco, 1895
- Armatus A. N. Golikov, 1986
- †Asiella Kryachkova, 1969
- Banzarecolpus A. W. B. Powell, 1957
- Broderiptella Olsson, 1964
- Callostracum E. A. Smith, 1909
- †Calvertitella Petuch, 1988
- Caviturritella Friend & B. M. Anderson, 2023
- †Colposigma H. J. Finlay & Marwick, 1937
- Colpospira J. Donald, 1900
- †Costacolpus Marwick, 1966
- †Cristispira Allison, 1965
- Gazameda Iredale, 1924
- Haustator Montfort, 1810
- Helminthia Handmann, 1882
- Incatella DeVries, 2007
- †Kapalmerella Allmon, 2005
- Maoricolpus H. J. Finlay, 1926
- †Mariacolpus Petuch, 1988
- †Nairiella Hacobjan, 1969
- Neohaustator Ida, 1952
- †Nodosella Hacobjan, 1969
- †Oligodia Handmann, 1882
- †Peyrotia Cossmann, 1912
- †Ptychidia Handmann, 1882
- †Roamerella S. K. Donovan & van den Hoek Ostende, 2013
- †Spirocolpus H. J. Finlay, 1926
- Stiracolpus H. J. Finlay, 1926
- †Tachyrhinchella Titova, 1994
- Tachyrhynchus Mörch, 1868
- Torcula J. E. Gray, 1847
- †Torquesia H. Douvillé, 1929
- †Torquesiella Pchelintsev, 1969
- Tropicolpus Marwick, 1931
- Turritella Lamarck, 1799 - the type genus of the family
- Turritellinella Harzhauser & Landau, 2019
- Vermicularia Lamarck, 1799
- †Viennella Harzhauser & Landau, 2019
- Zeacolpus H. J. Finlay, 1926

Other

- †Arcotia Stoliczka, 1867
- †Leptocolpus H. J. Finlay & Marwick, 1937

== Palaeontological locations ==
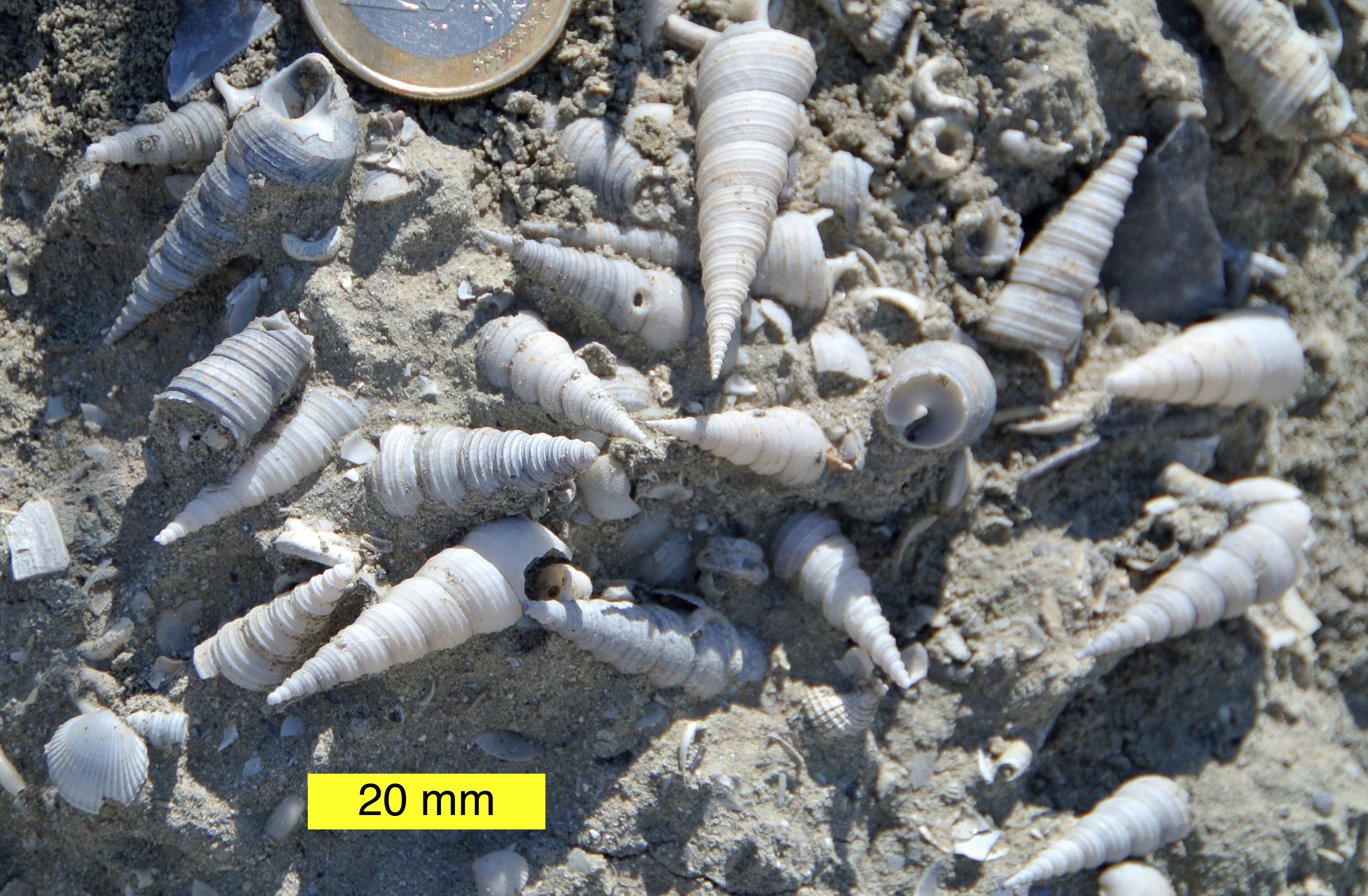
Turritella from the Pleistocene of Sicily.

- The Turritellenplatte of Ermingen ("Erminger Turritellenplatte" near Ulm, Germany) is situated in the northern part of the North Alpine Foreland Basin (NAFB) and is of interest for its abundance of Turritella turris gastropod shells within sedimentary deposits. The fauna of the gastropod-rich sandstone reflects mainly towards near-coastal and shallow marine conditions. Petrographical and palaeontological data allow for a correlation with this area and the Burdigalian age (Lower Miocene epoch). Based on the Sr-isotope composition of shark teeth in the area, the age of the area is about 18,5 Ma.
