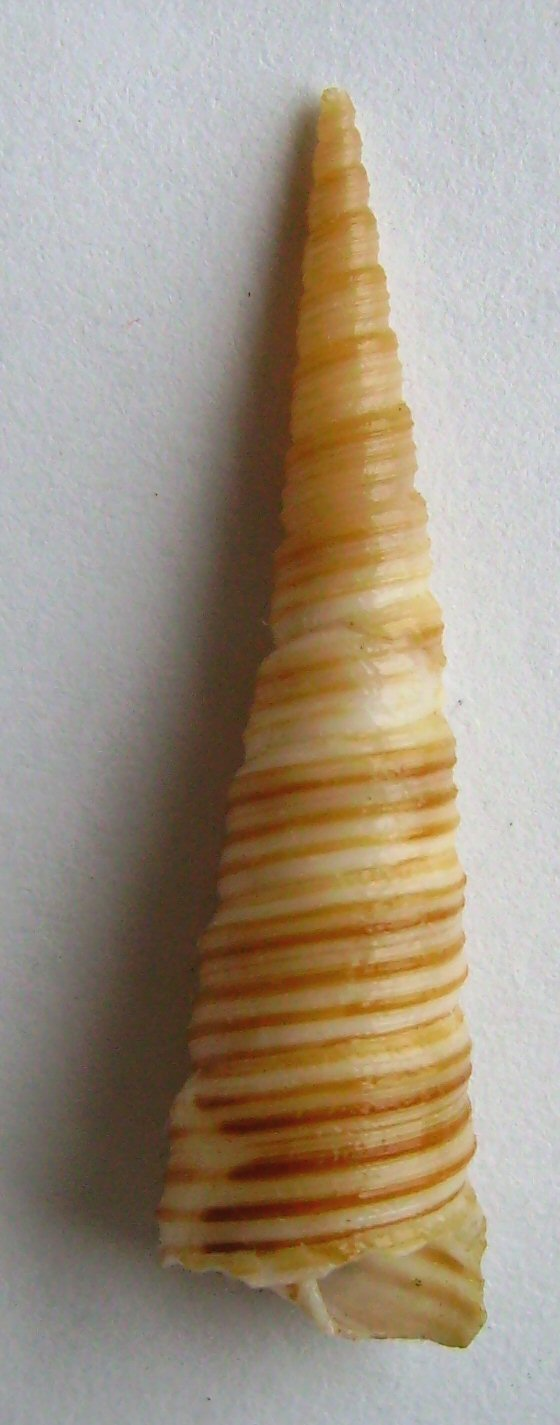
- A shell of Zeacolpus vittatus

Scientific classification
- Domain: Eukaryota
- Kingdom: Animalia
- Phylum: Mollusca
- Class: Gastropoda
- Subclass: Caenogastropoda
- Family: Turritellidae
- Subfamily: Turritellinae
- Genus: Zeacolpus; Finlay, 1927

Type species
- Zeacolpus vittatus Hutton, F.W., 1873

Species
- See text

= Zeacolpus =

Genus of gastropods

Zeacolpus is a genus of medium-sized sea snails, marine gastropod molluscs in the family Turritellidae, known as the turritellas or tower shells.

== Species ==
Species within the genus Zeacolpus include:

- Zeacolpus capricornius Garrard, 1972
- Zeacolpus fulminatus Hutton, 1873
- Zeacolpus vittatus (Hutton, 1873)

Species brought into synonymy

- Zeacolpus ahiparanus (Powell, 1927) : synonym of Stiracolpus ahiparanus (Powell, A.W.B., 1927)
- Zeacolpus ascensus Marwick, 1957 : synonym of Stiracolpus pagoda (Reeve, 1849)
- Zeacolpus blacki Marwick, 1957 : synonym of Stiracolpus pagoda (Reeve, 1849)
- Zeacolpus delli Marwick, 1957 : synonym of Stiracolpus pagoda (Reeve, 1849)
- Zeacolpus knoxi knoxi Marwick, 1957 : synonym of Stiracolpus pagoda (Reeve, 1849)
- Zeacolpus knoxi tardior Marwick, 1957 : synonym of Stiracolpus pagoda (Reeve, 1849)
- Zeacolpus maorius (Powell, 1940) : synonym of Stiracolpus pagoda (Reeve, 1849)
- Zeacolpus mixtus Finlay, 1930 : synonym of Stiracolpus pagoda (Reeve, 1849)
- Zeacolpus pagodus (Reeve, 1849) : synonym of Stiracolpus pagoda (Reeve, 1849)
- Zeacolpus pagoda pagoda (Reeve, 1849) : synonym of Stiracolpus pagoda (Reeve, 1849)
- Zeacolpus pagoda powelli Marwick, 1957 : synonym of Stiracolpus pagoda (Reeve, 1849)
- Zeacolpus symmetricus (Hutton, 1873) : synonym of Stiracolpus symmetricus (Hutton, 1873)
