= Northcroft =

Northcroft is a surname. Notable people with the surname include:

- Earle Northcroft (1896–1962), New Zealand botanist and physician
- Erima Northcroft (1884–1953), New Zealand lawyer and judge, father of Nancy
- George Northcroft (1869–1943), British orthodontist
- Hilda Margaret Northcroft (1882–1951), New Zealand medical doctor
- Jonathan Northcroft, Scottish sportswriter
- Nancy Northcroft (1913–1980), New Zealand architect, daughter of Erima
- Percy Northcroft (1886–1967), American football player and naval officer

== See also ==
- Northcraft
