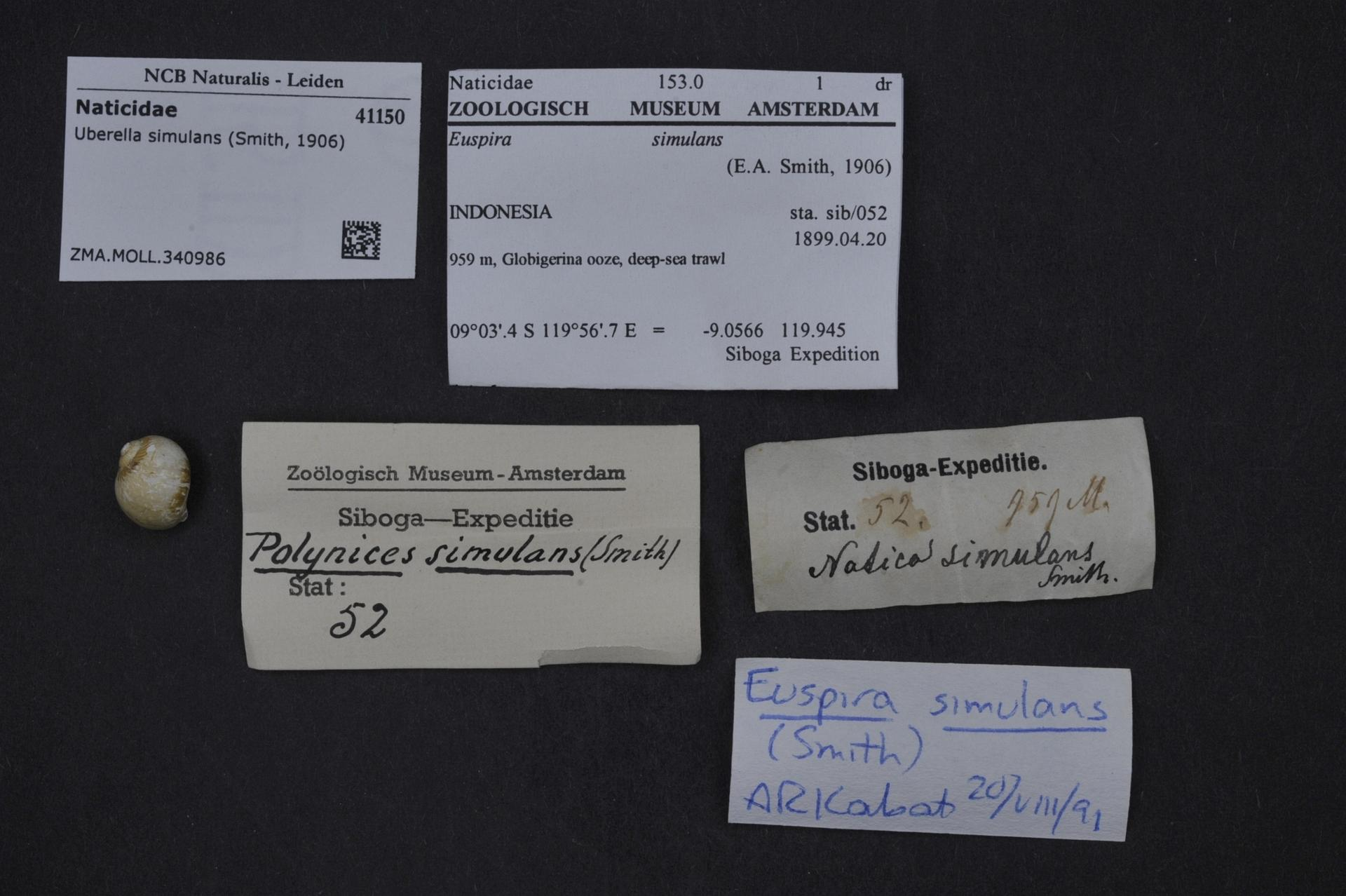
- Uberella simulans (Smith, 1906) - Naticidae - Mollusc shell

Scientific classification
- Kingdom: Animalia
- Phylum: Mollusca
- Class: Gastropoda
- Subclass: Caenogastropoda
- Order: Littorinimorpha
- Family: Naticidae
- Genus: Uberella; Finlay, 1928

Type species
- Natica vitrea Hutton, 1873

Species
- See text.

= Uberella =

Uberella Temporal range: Miocene to Recent

Genus of gastropods

Uberella is a genus of sea snails, marine gastropod molluscs in the family Naticidae, the moon snails.

== Species ==
Species within the genus Uberella include:

- Uberella alacris Dell, 1956:
- Uberella barrierensis (Marwick, 1924)
- Uberella denticulifera (Marwick, 1924)
- † Uberella keyesi Marwick, 1965
- † Uberella maesta (Marwick, 1924)
- † Uberella marwicki Powell, 1935
- † Uberella pseudovitrea (Finlay, 1924)
- † Uberella pukeuriensis (Marwick, 1924)
- Uberella simulans (E.A. Smith, 1906)
- Uberella vitrea (Hutton, 1873)

Species brought into synonymy

- † Uberella acerva Laws, 1933: synonym of Tahunacca acerva (Laws, 1933)
- † Uberella cicatricella Marwick, 1965: synonym of Pliconacca cicatricella (Marwick, 1965)
- † Uberella cicatrix Marwick, 1931: synonym of Pliconacca cicatrix (Marwick, 1931)

== Bibliography ==
- Powell A. W. B. (1979), New Zealand Mollusca, William Collins Publishers Ltd, Auckland, New Zealand ISBN 0-00-216906-1
- Torigoe K. & Inaba A. (2011) Revision on the classification of Recent Naticidae. Bulletin of the Nishinomiya Shell Museum 7: 133 + 15 pp., 4 pls
