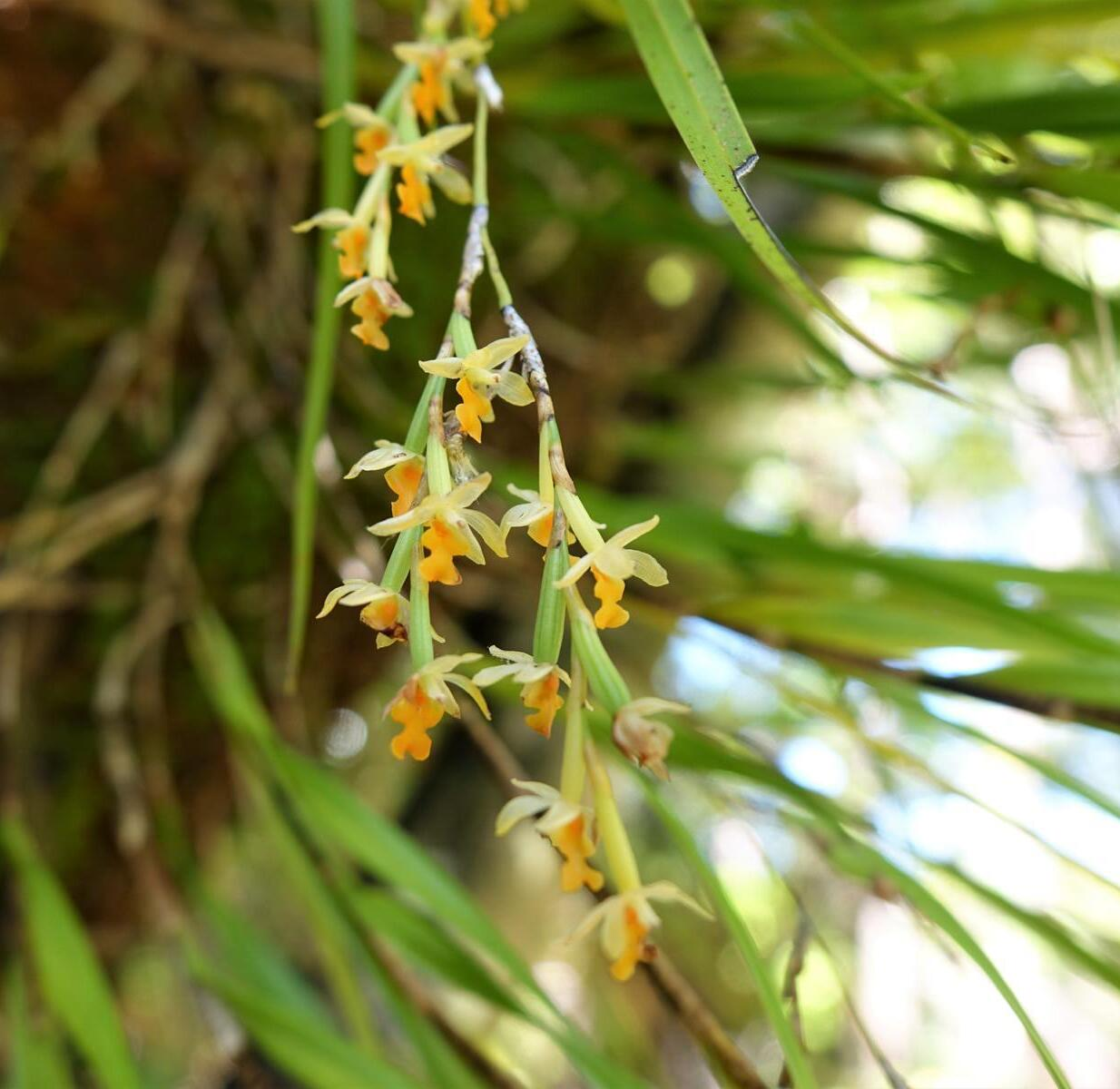

Scientific classification
- Kingdom: Plantae
- Clade: Tracheophytes
- Clade: Angiosperms
- Clade: Monocots
- Order: Asparagales
- Family: Orchidaceae
- Subfamily: Epidendroideae
- Genus: Earina
- Species: E. aestivalis

Binomial name
- Earina aestivalis Thomas Cheeseman, 1919

= Earina aestivalis =

Species of plant

Earina aestivalis, commonly known as bamboo orchid or summer earina, is a species of pendent orchid that is endemic to New Zealand. The specific epithet, aestivalis, is derived from Latin and means "pertaining to the summer".

It is epiphytic, with long and strong rhizomes that are firmly attached to its host. It produces many long cane-like stems up to 60 cm long, with purple spots. It has pointed leaves 6–10 cm long. The leaf sheaths range from ivory to white-yellow, and are spotted dark purple-brown.

It flowers from December to March, with inflorescences containing 2-8 flower clusters and reaching up to 8 cm. The flower petals and sepals are greenish cream-yellow, and the labellums yellow-orange. It also produces fruit capsules from January to August. The seeds are wind dispersed.

== Taxonomy ==
E. aestivalis is from the family Orchidaceae. Unlike those found elsewhere, the E. aestivalis specimens from the Chatham Islands are not distinct, and seem to grade into E. mucronata.

== Distribution ==
It is endemic to New Zealand, and can be found on both the North and South Islands, along with the Chatham Islands and Stewart Island. It is found in coastal and lowland forests. It is usually found on low branches and trunks, but can sometimes be found on cliff faces and rocks.

== Conservation status ==
As of the 2023 assessment by the New Zealand Threat Classification System, it is regarded as "Not Threatened".

== Gallery ==
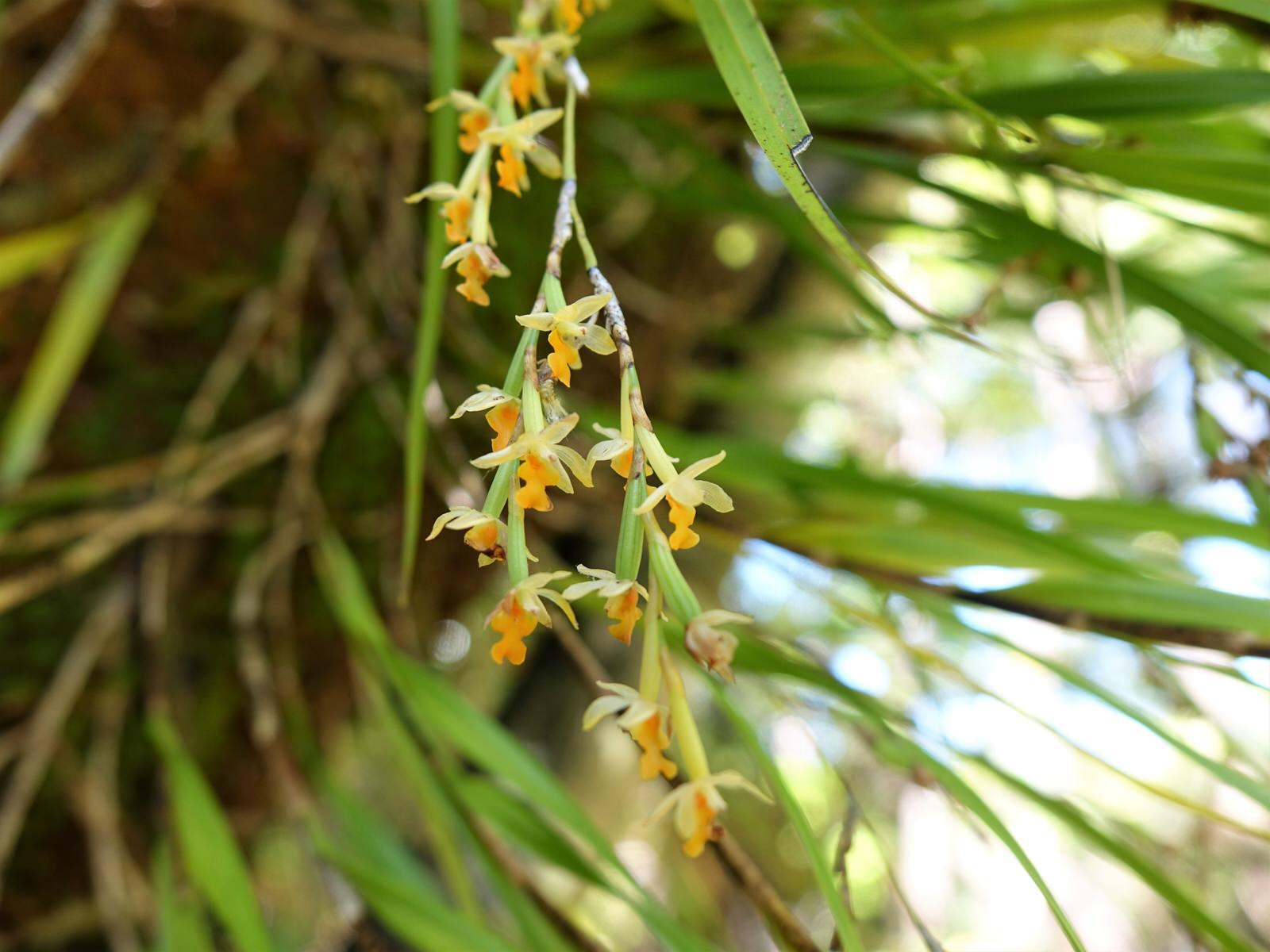

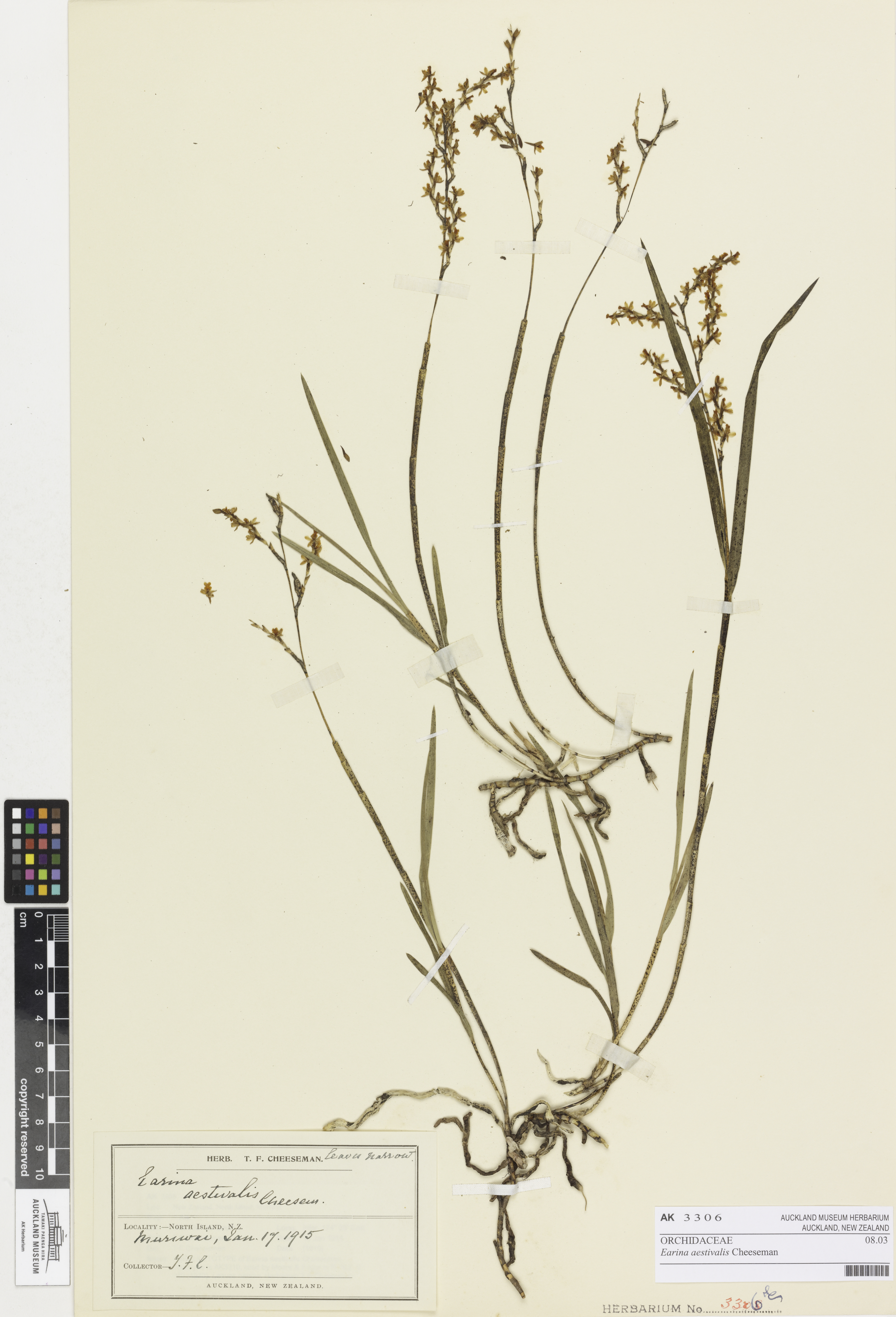
Herbarium specimen from Auckland War Memorial Museum
