= Gerrit Wolf =

American psychologist (born 1941)

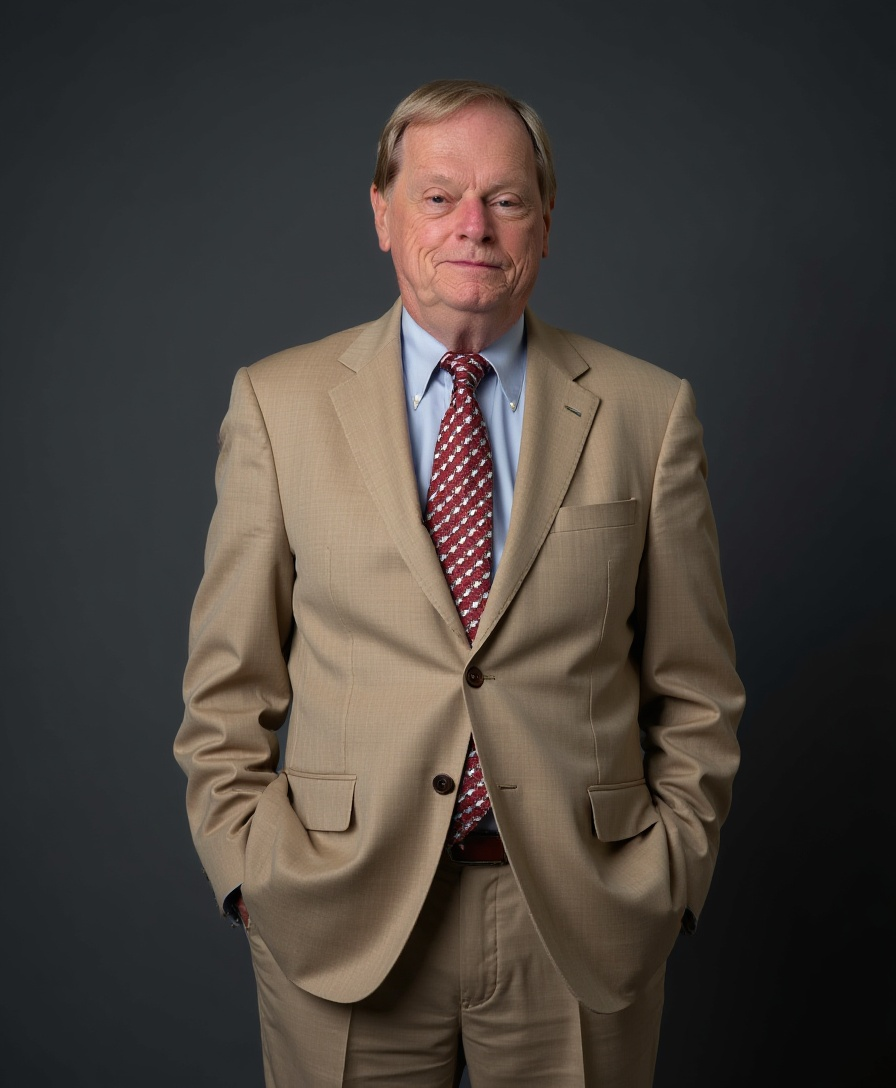
- Born: October 9, 1941 (age 85); Evanston, Illinois, U.S.
- Occupations: Industrial and organizational psychologist, academic and author

Academic background
- Education: B.S., Psychology, Ph.D., Social Psychology, Hope College, Cornell University

Academic work
- Institutions: University of Arizona, Georgia Tech, Yale University, Stony Brook University
- Doctoral students: Jim Bettman

Gerrit Wolf is an American industrial and organizational psychologist, academic, and author. He is a professor emeritus in the College of Business (COB) and emeritus Director of the Innovation Center at Stony Brook University (SBU) in New York State.

Most known for his entrepreneurship research, Wolf focuses on Wireless technology's impact on organizations and consumers and has published over 60 academic articles on conflict management, decision-making, and leadership. He held the Fulbright Alexander Hamilton Chair of Entrepreneurship in 1993, and served as the first Fulbright Chair of Wireless E-Commerce in 2001. Collaborating with his students, he has consulted for firms including Symbol Technologies and Ericsson.

== Education ==
Wolf served as the Anchor Editor of the Hope College newspaper and earned his B.S. in Psychology with a major at Hope College in Holland, Michigan, in 1963, followed by attending the University of Vienna in Austria for Summer School in 1961. Subsequently, he pursued his Ph.D. in Social Psychology at Cornell University in Ithaca, New York, completing his doctoral degree in 1967. During his early career, he also held summer roles, including salesman for the Encyclopædia Britannica, research assistant for a market research firm, and reporter for a Chicago newspaper.

== Career ==
Wolf has held various academic positions, beginning as a teaching assistant at Cornell University's Psychology Department from 1964 to 1966, then serving as an instructor until 1967. Afterward, he worked at Yale University, progressing from assistant professor to associate professor in the Administrative Sciences and Psychology Departments. He then taught at Georgia Tech and the University of Arizona before joining Stony Brook University in 1985. Additionally, he contributed to the COB SBU Summer School Business Program in Rome, Italy, from 2013 to 2017. He has been appointed professor emeritus at Stony Brook University's COB since 2022.

Wolf directed undergraduate studies at Yale University from 1971 to 1975 before assuming various administrative roles, including positions at the Georgia Institute of Technology and the University of Arizona. He served as chair of the Management and Policy Department at U Arizona from 1981 to 1985, dean of Stony Brook University's Harriman School from 1985 to 1991, and directed the Technology Management Executive Program from 1996 to 1999. Since 2000, he has been a University Senator at SBU, and directed the Honors Business Program from 2003 to 2010. He also serves as an advisor board member of the Clean Energy Business Incubator Program, and has been the director of the Innovation Concentration and SBU's Innovation Center since 2010. From 2015 to 2017, he advised the online MBA in Innovation and Shift Group and co-chaired the Pandemic Shift Program at the CoB from 2020 to 2021.

Wolf has held research appointments, including project manager and co-investigator on studies funded by organizations such as NSF and the National Center for Health Services Research, collaborating on the Pandemic International Research Team from 2020 to 2021 and serving as a co-investigator on the NSF project "Entrepreneurship in Engineering" from 2004 to 2011.

== Research ==
Gerrit Wolf's scholarship spans more than five decades and integrates social psychology, management, entrepreneurship, organizational behavior, and measurement. His research may be organized into three interrelated themes: Innovation, Exchange, and Measurement. Across these domains, Wolf's work has examined how organizations create value, how individuals and groups coordinate behavior, and how social and organizational phenomena can be measured reliably.

=== Innovation ===
Innovation has been a central theme throughout Wolf's career. He conceptualized innovation as emerging from the interaction of invention, investment, and entrepreneurship, emphasizing that successful innovation requires not only technological creativity but also organizational resources and entrepreneurial action.

One of his most influential contributions was the study of organizational slack. In the widely cited article 'The Antecedents of Organizational Slack" (1988), co-authored with Mark Sharfman, Richard Chase, and David Tansik, Wolf examined how organizations create and sustain excess resources that enable experimentation and innovation. The paper became a foundational work in management theory, receiving more than one thousand citations and influencing subsequent research on organizational adaptation and strategic flexibility.

Wolf extended these ideas empirically in research on service design and banking. A study of savings and loan branches demonstrated how technology and social spaces could be combined to serve different customer segments. Innovations examined included automated teller systems, software-based customer service tools modeled after successful branch managers, and community spaces designed to foster customer engagement.

Another line of research focused on investment decisions and entrepreneurship. Building on debates between microeconomics and behavioral economics, Wolf and Gregory Northcraft investigated how sunk costs influence decisions to continue investing in projects. Their influential article "Dollars, Sense, and Sunk Costs" (1984) proposed a life-cycle model of resource allocation and became a seminal contribution to behavioral decision making. Related work with Edward Conlon examined escalation of commitment, showing how previous investments affect future decisions.

Wolf also explored the relationship between invention and entrepreneurship in engineering and technology settings. His studies examined how engineering students become entrepreneurs, how displaced engineers transition into entrepreneurial careers, and how business students support startup firms through incubator programs. This research anticipated later developments in the concept of the entrepreneurial university and culminated in his 2017 case study of Stony Brook University, which analyzed how research universities can foster startup formation and regional innovation ecosystems.

His contributions to entrepreneurship and innovation have also extended internationally through Fulbright appointments in Hungary and Sweden, research on wireless technologies, and leadership of Stony Brook University's Innovation Center.

=== Exchange ===
Another major theme in Wolf's research concerns exchange relationships among individuals, groups, and organizations. Drawing on game theory, social exchange theory, and simulation methods, he investigated how cooperation emerges under conditions of conflict and mutual dependence.

In collaboration with economist Martin Shubik, Wolf conducted pioneering research on experimental markets and duopoly competition. Using computer-based business games, participants made decisions regarding production, pricing, and advertising while competing against artificial players programmed with strategic rules. These studies demonstrated how market interactions converge toward equilibrium over time and provided early insights into strategic behavior in competitive environments.

Wolf also examined superior-subordinate relationships within organizations. Working with Larry Zahn, he modeled leadership as a dynamic process of reciprocal influence. Their research represented managerial interactions as repeated games and employed Markov models to study patterns of cooperation and conflict. The findings suggested that cooperative relationships between supervisors and subordinates occur more frequently than predicted by standard game-theoretic strategies.

Another stream of research focused on human communication and conversation. Early studies modeled conversations as exchange systems governed by turn-taking and mutual adjustment. Using innovative measurement techniques, including bone-conductance microphones, Wolf and his collaborators analyzed speaking patterns and demonstrated that conversational behavior could be represented as dynamic systems converging toward equilibrium states.

=== Measurement ===
A third and highly influential area of Wolf's scholarship concerns measurement methodology. His work in this domain has had substantial impact across psychology, management, and organizational research.

Wolf is best known for his collaboration with Larry James and Robert Demaree on measures of interrater agreement. Their articles on estimating within-group reliability and the development of the rwg statistic became among the most highly cited publications in organizational research. These methods provided researchers with tools for assessing the degree of agreement among raters while accounting for response biases, and they have been widely adopted across multiple disciplines.

Wolf also contributed to the measurement of organizational and social phenomena in a variety of settings. His research examined physician job satisfaction and task delegation in healthcare organizations, productivity and performance in manufacturing systems, statistical power and hypothesis testing, decision-making processes, and the measurement of work-related fatigue.

== Intellectual legacy ==
Wolf's scholarship bridges social psychology, management science, entrepreneurship, and organizational theory. His work combines formal modeling with empirical investigation and has influenced research on innovation, decision making, social exchange, and measurement. Through his academic leadership, international appointments, and mentorship of students and entrepreneurs, he has contributed to the development of the entrepreneurial university and to the application of social science research to technological and organizational change.

== Recognition ==
- 2016–2022 – Most Cited Publication Award, College of Business, Stony Brook University, for the James, Demaree, and Wolf interrater agreement research
- 2012 – Teacher of the Year Award, MBA Program, College of Business, Stony Brook University
- 2000–2001 – Fulbright Chair in Wireless E-Commerce at the Stockholm School of Economics and the Royal Institute of Technology (KTH), Stockholm, Sweden
- 1997 – Teacher of the Year Award, Graduate Students, Harriman School for Management and Policy, Stony Brook University
- 1996 – Teacher of the Year Award, Undergraduate Students, Harriman School for Management and Policy, Stony Brook University
- 1993 – Alexander Hamilton Chair in Entrepreneurship and Fulbright Fellow, SEED Foundation and University of Economic Sciences, Budapest, Hungary
- 1984 – Member, External Advisory Board, University of Arizona

== Selected articles ==
=== Innovation ===
- Sharfman, Mark P.; Wolf, Gerrit; Chase, Richard B.; Tansik, David A. (1988). "Antecedents of Organizational Slack". The Academy of Management Review. 13 (4): 601. doi:10.2307/258378. ISSN 0363-7425. JSTOR 258378.
- Northcraft, Gregory B.; Wolf, Gerrit (1984). "Dollars, Sense, and Sunk Costs: A Life Cycle Model of Resource Allocation Decisions". The Academy of Management Review. 9 (2): 225. doi:10.2307/258436. ISSN 0363-7425. JSTOR 258436.
- Chase, Richard B.; Northcraft, Gregory B.; Wolf, Gerrit (1984). "DESIGNING HIGH-CONTACT SERVICE SYSTEMS: APPLICATION TO BRANCHES OF A SAVINGS AND LOAN*". Decision Sciences. 15 (4): 542–556. doi:10.1111/j.1540-5915.1984.tb01241.x. ISSN 0011-7315.
- Wolf, Gerrit; London, Manuel; Casey, Jeff; Pufahl, Joseph (1995). "Career Experience and Motivation as Predictors of Training Behaviors and Outcomes for Displaced Engineers". Journal of Vocational Behavior. 47 (3): 316–331. doi:10.1006/jvbe.1995.0006. ISSN 0001-8791.
- Luryi, Serge; Tang, Wendy; Lifshitz, Nadia; Wolf, Gerrit; Doboli, Simona; Betz, Joseph A.; Maritato, Peter; Shamash, Yacov (2007). "Entrepreneurship in engineering education". 2007 37th Annual Frontiers in Education Conference - Global Engineering: Knowledge Without Borders, Opportunities Without Passports. IEEE. pp. T2E–10-T2E-15. Bibcode:2007fie..conf..379L. doi:10.1109/fie.2007.4418174. ISBN 978-1-4244-1083-5.
- Wolf, Gerrit (2017-03-06). "Entrepreneurial university: a case study at Stony Brook University". Journal of Management Development. 36 (2): 286–294. doi:10.1108/jmd-06-2016-0113. ISSN 0262-1711.

=== Exchange ===
- Zahn, G.Lawrence; Wolf, Gerrit (1981). "Leadership and the art of cycle maintenance: A simulation model of superior—subordinate interaction". Organizational Behavior and Human Performance. 28 (1): 26–49. doi:10.1016/0030-5073(81)90013-1. ISSN 0030-5073.
- Hayes, Donald P.; Meltzer, Leo; Wolf, Gerritt (1970). "Substantive conclusions are dependent upon techniques of measurement". Behavioral Science. 15 (3): 265–268. doi:10.1002/bs.3830150307. ISSN 0005-7940.
- Shubik, Martin; Wolf, Gerrit; Lockhart, Scott (1971). "An Artificial Player for a Business Market Game". Simulation & Games. 2 (1): 27–43. doi:10.1177/104687817100200102. ISSN 0037-5500.
- Wolf, Gerrit; Shubik, Martin (1978). "Market Structure, Opponent Behavior, and Information in a Market Game". Decision Sciences. 9 (3): 421–428. doi:10.1111/j.1540-5915.1978.tb00731.x. ISSN 0011-7315.
- Wolf, Gerrit; Zahn, Larry (1972). "Exchange in games and communication". Organizational Behavior and Human Performance. 7 (1): 142–187. doi:10.1016/0030-5073(72)90012-8. ISSN 0030-5073.

=== Measurement ===
- James, Lawrence R.; Demaree, Robert G.; Wolf, Gerrit (1984). "Estimating within-group interrater reliability with and without response bias". Journal of Applied Psychology. 69 (1): 85–98. Bibcode:1984JApPs..69...85J. doi:10.1037/0021-9010.69.1.85. ISSN 1939-1854.
- James, Lawrence R.; Demaree, Robert G.; Wolf, Gerrit (1993). "rwg: An assessment of within-group interrater agreement". Journal of Applied Psychology. 78 (2): 306–309. Bibcode:1993JApPs..78..306J. doi:10.1037/0021-9010.78.2.306. ISSN 1939-1854.
- Breslau, Naomi; Novack, Alvin H.; Wolf, Gerrit (1978). "Work Settings and Job Satisfaction". Medical Care. 16 (10): 850–862. doi:10.1097/00005650-197810000-00005. ISSN 0025-7079. PMID 703410.
- Mark Young, S.; Shields, Michael D.; Wolf, Gerrit (1988). "Manufacturing controls and performance: An experiment". Accounting, Organizations and Society. 13 (6): 607–618. doi:10.1016/0361-3682(88)90034-7. ISSN 0361-3682.
- Wolf, Gerrit; Cartwright, Bliss (1974). "Rules for coding dummy variables in multiple regression". Psychological Bulletin. 81 (3): 173–179. doi:10.1037/h0035848. ISSN 1939-1455.
- Wolf, Gerrit; Connolly, Terry (1981). "BETWEEN-SUBJECT DESIGNS IN TESTING EXPECTANCY MODELS: A METHODOLOGICAL NOTE*". Decision Sciences. 12 (1): 39–45. doi:10.1111/j.1540-5915.1981.tb00058.x. ISSN 0011-7315.
