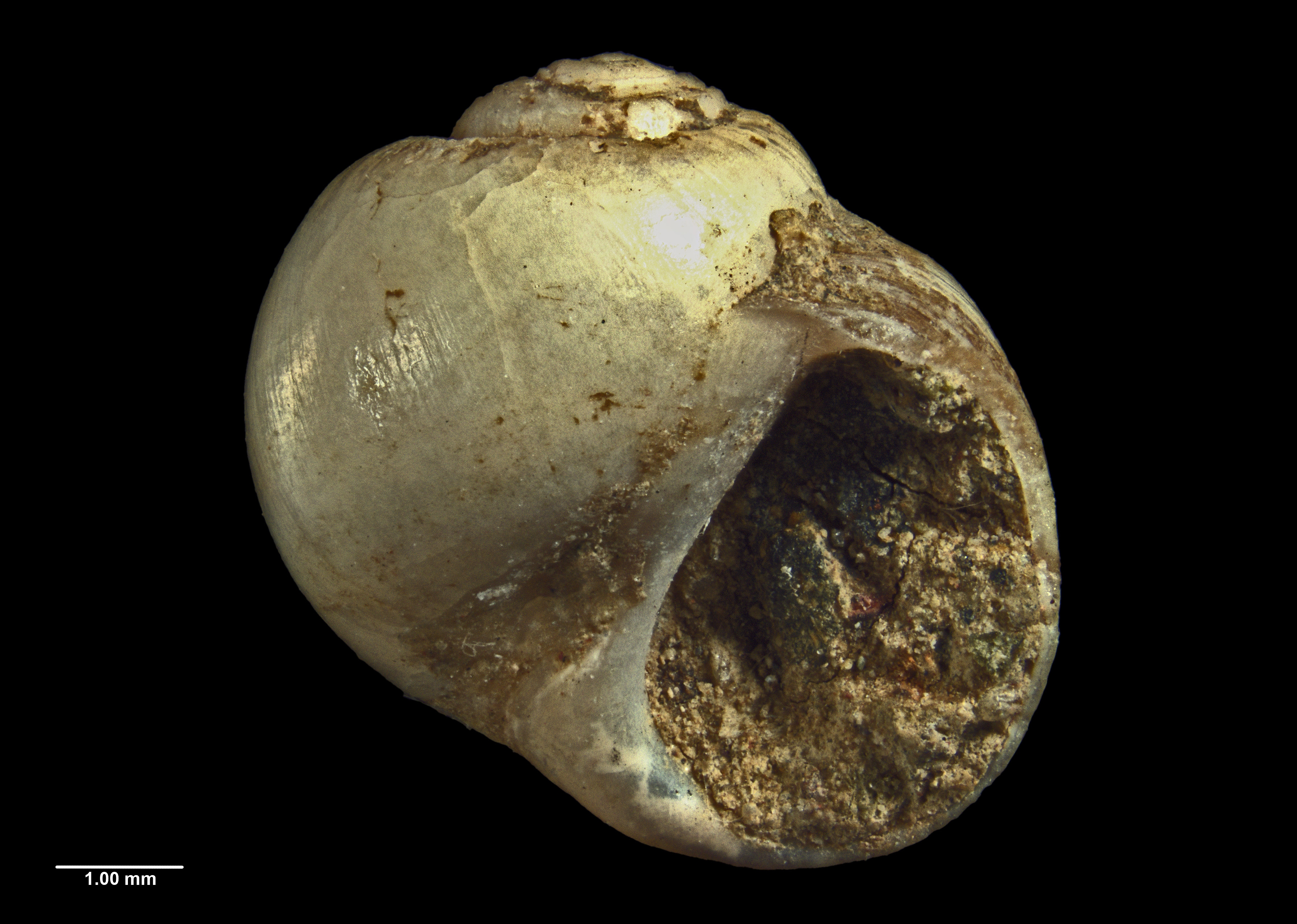
- Holotype from Auckland War Memorial Museum

Scientific classification
- Kingdom: Animalia
- Phylum: Mollusca
- Class: Gastropoda
- Subclass: Caenogastropoda
- Order: Littorinimorpha
- Family: Naticidae
- Genus: Uberella
- Species: †U. marwicki

Binomial name
- †Uberella marwicki A. W. B. Powell, 1935

= Uberella marwicki =

Uberella marwicki Temporal range: early Miocene

Extinct species of gastropod

Uberella marwicki is an extinct species of sea snail, a marine gastropod mollusc, in the family Naticidae. Fossils of the species date to early Miocene strata of the west coast of the Auckland Region, New Zealand.

== Description ==
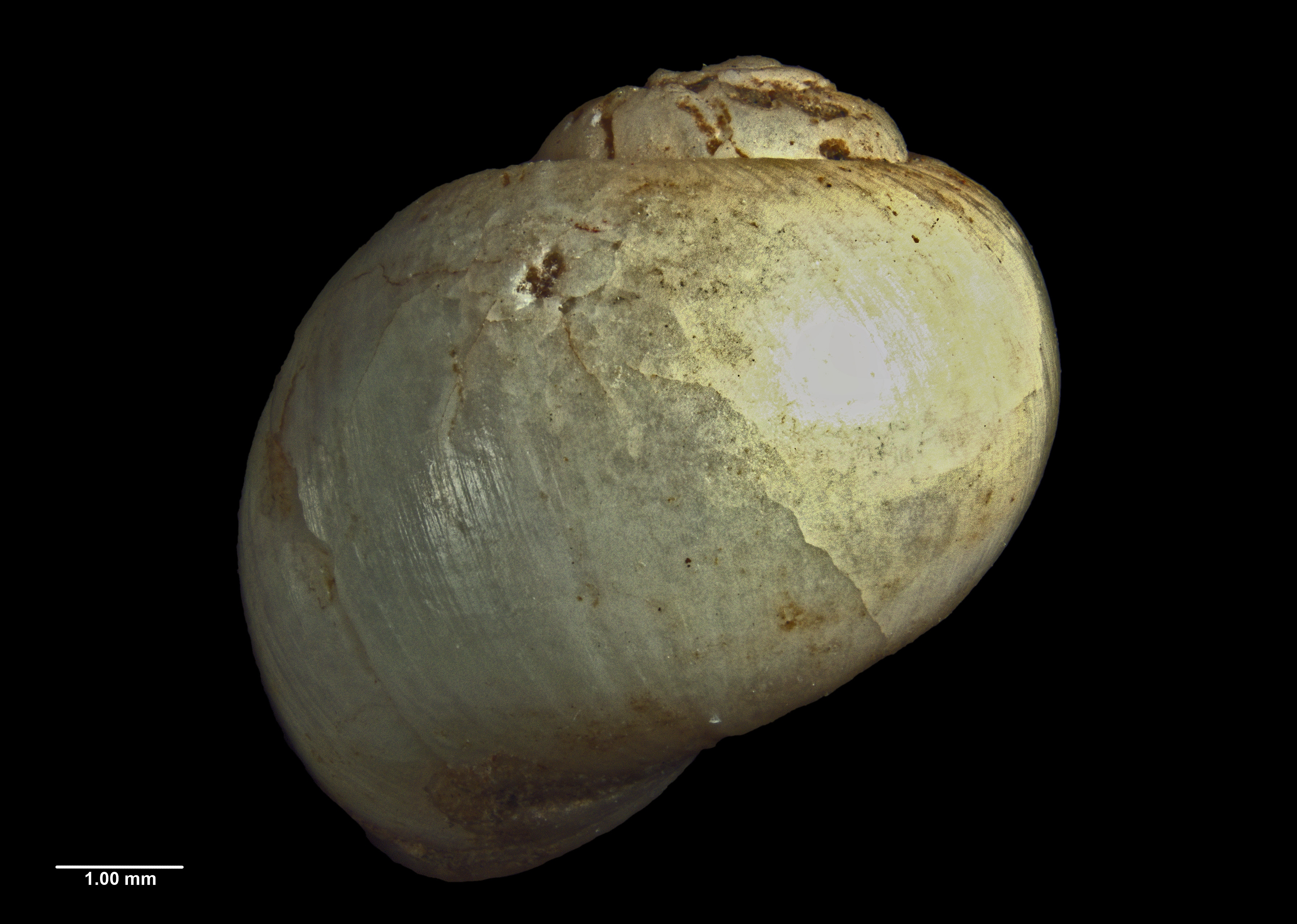
Side view of holotype

In the original description, Powell described the species as follows:

Shell small, solid, globular, smooth. Spire depressed, about one-fourth the height of the aperture. Whorls four, including a typical paucispiral protoconch of one whorl. Suture abutting and somewhat impressed; axial growth lines fairly prominent for a short distance below the suture. Umbilicus small, not deep. Parietal callus narrow, widest above, with a small semi-circular gap in it at the umbilicus, and very much thickened on the lower section of the columella and around the basal part of the aperture.

The holotype of the species measures 6.5 mm (0.26 in) in length and has a diameter of 6.5 mm (0.26 in). The species can be differentiated from other members of Uberella due to having a very large lower columella and basal lip, and due to the semi-circular gap in the species' callus above its small umbilicus.

== Taxonomy ==
The species was first described by A. W. B. Powell in 1935, who named the species after New Zealand palaeontologist John Marwick. The holotype was collected at an unknown date prior to 1935 from fallen rocks at the southern end of Maukatia Bay, south of Muriwai, Auckland Region (then more commonly known as Motutara), and is held in the collections of Auckland War Memorial Museum.

== Distribution ==
This extinct marine species occurs in early Miocene strata of the Nihotupu Formation of New Zealand, on the west coast of the Waitākere Ranges of the Auckland Region, New Zealand.
