= 1924 Chatham Islands expedition =

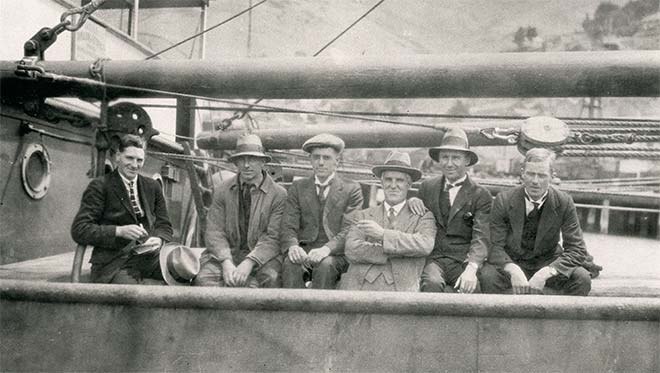
- Country: New Zealand
- Start: December 1923
- End: February 1924
- Participants: Robin Allan; Harry Skinner; John Marwick; William Martin; George Howes; Earle Fead Northcroft; Maxwell W. Young

The 1924 Chatham Islands expedition was a scientific expedition undertaken in early 1924 to research the biodiversity and indigenous people of the Chatham Islands.

== Origins ==
Scientists on the expedition came from the Otago Institute, which sponsored the expedition, and Canterbury Museum.

== Members ==
- H.D. (Harry) Skinner, ethnology and anthropology
- Robin Allan, geology
- John Marwick, paleontology
- W.G. (George) Howes, entomology
- William Martin, botany
- Earle Northcroft, botany
- F. Key, magnetic survey
- Mr Walsh, magnetic survey
- R.M. (Robert Malcom) Laing, marine botany
- Gilbert Archey, birds and biology
- Stewart Lindsay, entomology
- Maxwell Young, marine biology

== Expedition ==
The expedition left Lyttelton on the ship Ngahere though Archey and Lindsay went ahead of the main party. They were in the Chathams for a month from January to February. Most of the party stayed in the northern part of the island but Howes and one other stayed in Waitangi travelling around on horseback.

== Results ==
Geological specimens were collected by Marwick from four sites on Chatham Island and by Allan from one site on Pitt Island. The Chatham sites were at Cape Young, Tioriori, Titirangi and Waikaripi and at Flowerpot Harbour on Pitt. Three types of rocks were recorded: quartz/mica/schists in the north, limestone in the middle of the island and around the lagoon, and volcanic rocks in the southern part.

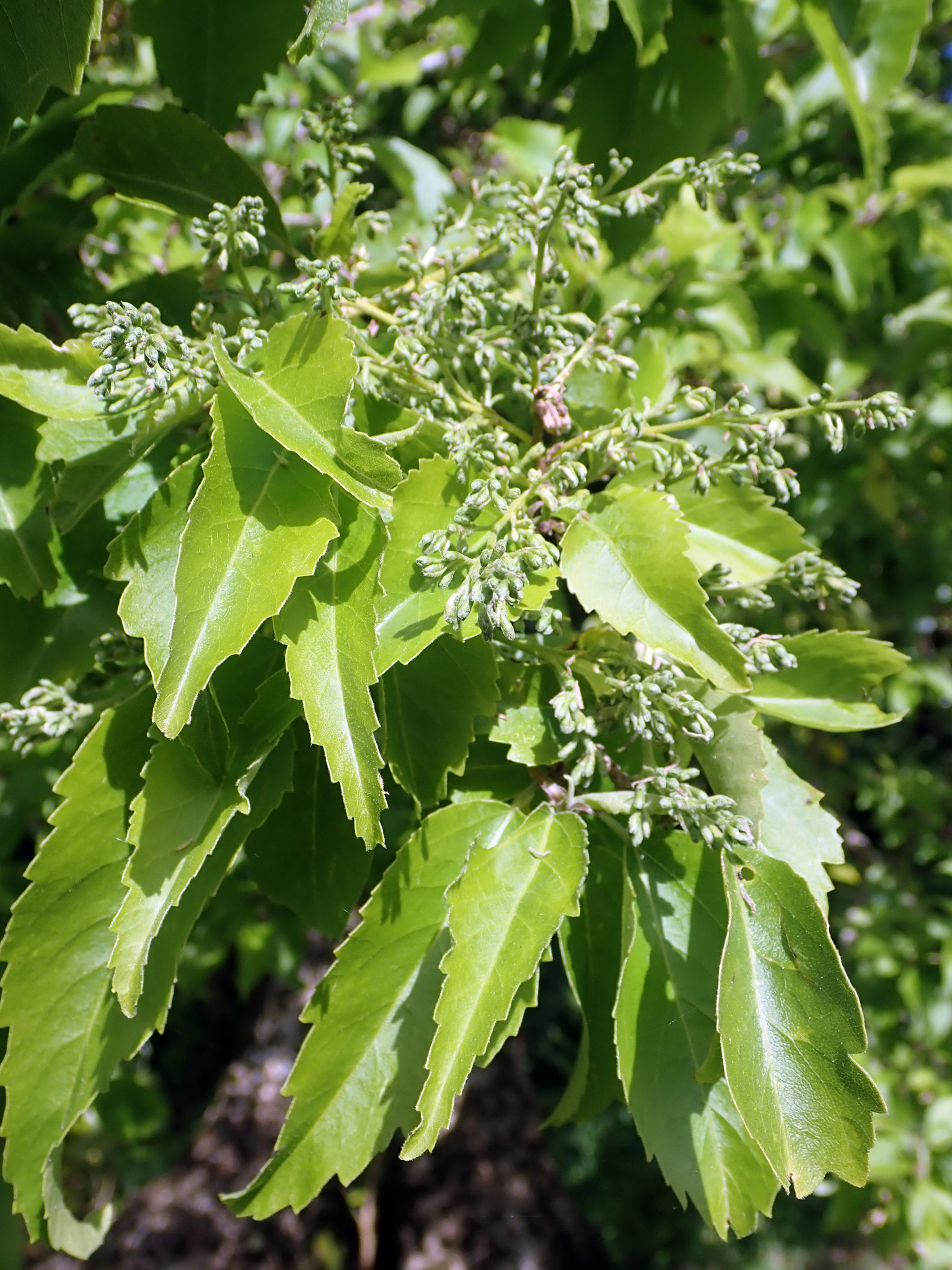
Ribbonwood (Plagianthus regius ssp. chathamicus)

Howes noted that the flora and fauna were similar to New Zealand and he was disappointed with his findings of moths, beetles and flies. He found prolific bird life including pukeko, ducks, swans and weka at the lagoon and pigeons, tūī, Chatham Island wrens and piwakawaka elsewhere. The introduced weka was considered to be a pest. The only predator was the Norwegian rat.

Northcroft's botanical findings were unpublished until his records were discovered and published posthumously by A.J. Healy. He recorded 53 species that had not been recorded by later researchers but no specimens exist. Some new species on the Chathams were found including a ribbon wood and an orchid described by Martin.

Many specimens of marine fauna were collected including several species of sea slug. It was noted that much work still needed to be done surveying and charting the waters around the islands to assist gathering better information on the habits of marine species.

Skey and Walsh attempted to pinpoint the longitude and latitude of the islands more precisely.

Ethnologist Skinner continued his work on the Moriori which he had begun on an earlier visit to the Chathams in 1919. He studied carvings and physical anthropology which linked the Moriori to Polynesian peoples and culture.

== Bibliography ==
- Skinner, H.D. (1923–1928). "The Morioris of Chatham Islands". Memoirs of the Bernice P. Bishop Museum : volume IX. Bishop Museum memoirs. Bernice P. Bishop Museum. OCLC 907501191.
- Young, Maxwell (1930). "Marine Fauna of the Chatham Islands". Transactions and Proceedings of the Royal Society of New Zealand. 60: 136 – via Papers Past.
- Marwick, J (1928). "The Tertiary Mollusca of the Chatham Islands including a Generic Revision of the New Zealand Pectinidae". Transactions and Proceedings of the Royal Society of New Zealand. 58: 432.
- Archey, G. & Lindsay, C. (1924). "Notes on the birds of the Chatham Islands". Records of the Canterbury Museum 2(4): 187–201.
