= Uberella denticulifera =

Scientific classification
- Kingdom: Animalia
- Phylum: Mollusca
- Class: Gastropoda
- Subclass: Caenogastropoda
- Order: Littorinimorpha
- Family: Naticidae
- Genus: Uberella
- Species: U. denticulifera

Binomial name
- Uberella denticulifera (Marwick, 1924)

Synonyms
- Natica denticulifera Marwick, 1924

Species of gastropod

Uberella denticulifera is a species of sea snail, a marine gastropod mollusc in the family Naticidae, the moon snails.
