= Uberella barrierensis =

Scientific classification
- Kingdom: Animalia
- Phylum: Mollusca
- Class: Gastropoda
- Subclass: Caenogastropoda
- Order: Littorinimorpha
- Family: Naticidae
- Genus: Uberella
- Species: U. barrierensis

Binomial name
- Uberella barrierensis (Marwick, 1924)

Species of gastropod

Uberella barrierensis is a species of sea snail, a marine gastropod mollusc in the family Naticidae, the moon snails.

== Distribution ==
This marine species is endemic to New Zealand.
