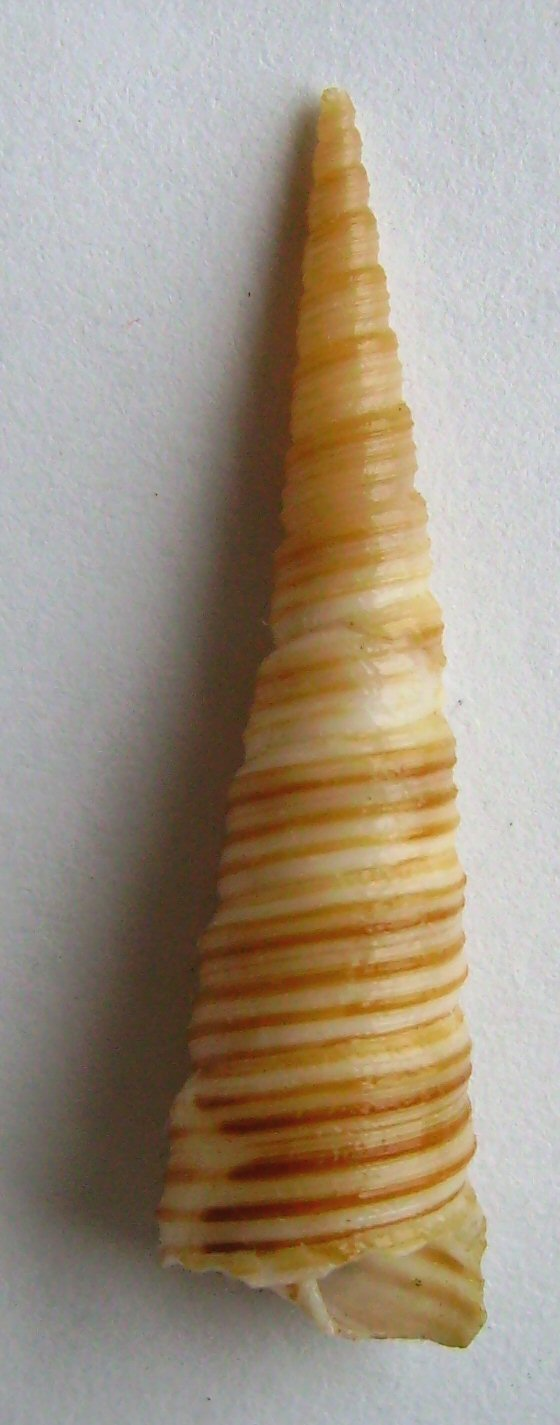
- Apertural view of a shell of Zeacolpus vittatus; as a juvenile this individual was subjected to a break (possibly an attempted predation) that on being repaired caused the shell spire to appear to be bent

Scientific classification
- Kingdom: Animalia
- Phylum: Mollusca
- Class: Gastropoda
- Subclass: Caenogastropoda
- Order: incertae sedis
- Family: Turritellidae
- Genus: Zeacolpus
- Species: Z. vittatus

Binomial name
- Zeacolpus vittatus (Hutton, 1873)

Synonyms
- Turritella vittata Hutton, 1873; Turritella carlottae Watson, 1881

= Zeacolpus vittatus =

Species of gastropod

Zeacolpus vittatus is a species of large sea snail, a marine gastropod mollusc in the family Turritellidae, the tower snails.
