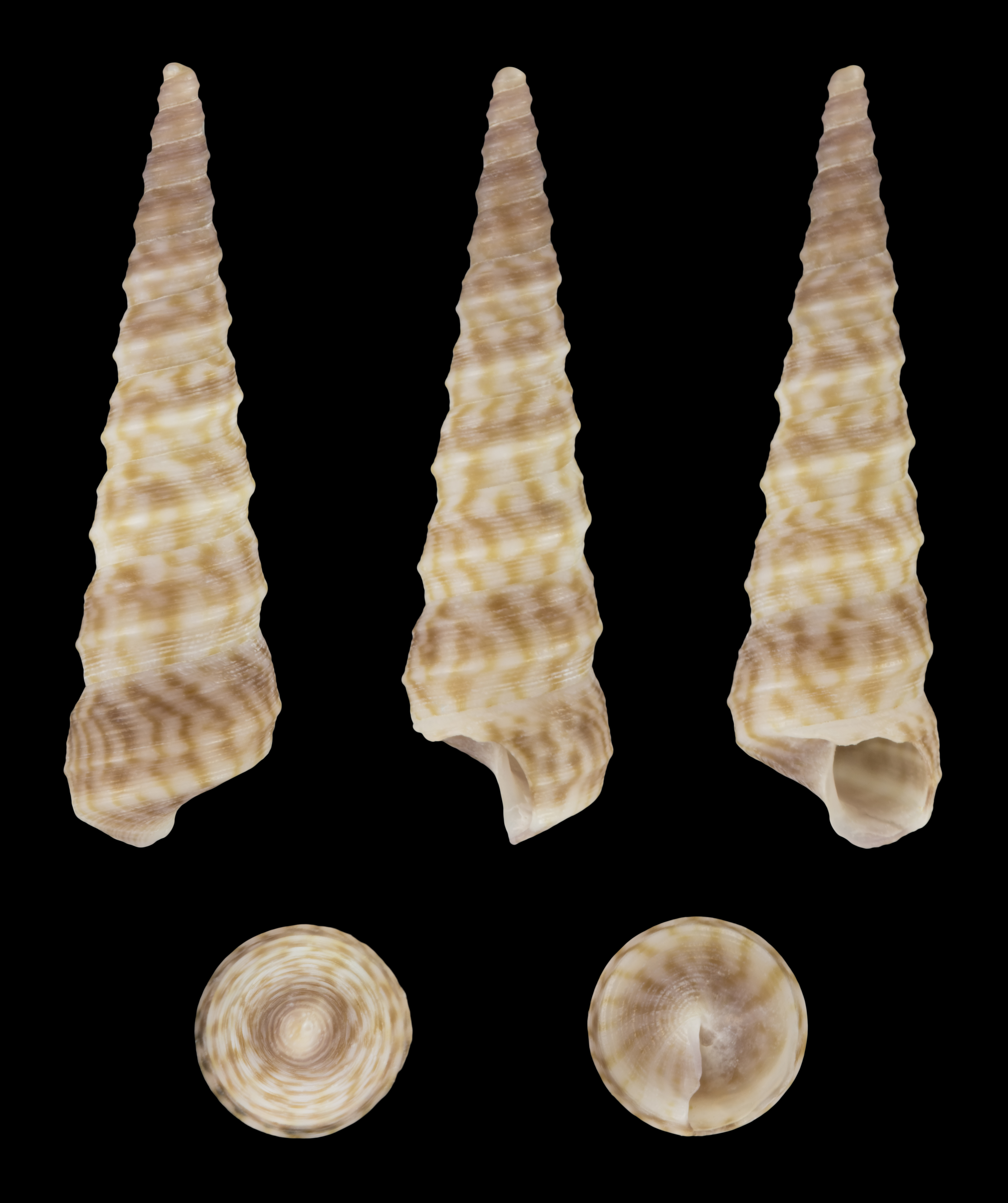

Scientific classification
- Kingdom: Animalia
- Phylum: Mollusca
- Class: Gastropoda
- Subclass: Caenogastropoda
- Order: incertae sedis
- Family: Turritellidae
- Genus: Stiracolpus
- Species: S. pagoda

Binomial name
- Stiracolpus pagoda (Reeve, 1849)

Synonyms
- Stiracolpus blacki (Marwick, 1957); Stiracolpus delli delli (Marwick, 1957); Stiracolpus uttleyi ruahinensis (Marwick, 1957); Turritella pagoda Reeve, 1849; Zeacolpus ascencus Marwick, 1957; Zeacolpus blacki Marwick, 1957; Zeacolpus delli Marwick, 1957; Zeacolpus (Stiracolpus) delli delli Marwick, J., 1957; Zeacolpus knoxi Marwick, 1957; Zeacolpus knoxi tardior Marwick, 1957; Zeacolpus maorius (Powell, 1940); Zeacolpus mixtus Finlay, 1930; Zeacolpus pagoda (Reeve, 1849); Zeacolpus pagoda pagoda Marwick, 1957; Zeacolpus (Stiracolpus) pagoda powelli Marwick, J., 1957

= Stiracolpus pagoda =

Species of gastropod

Stiracolpus pagoda, common name the pagoda turret, is a species of sea snail, a marine gastropod mollusk in the family Turritellidae.

== Description ==
The shell size varies between 25 mm and 80 mm.

== Distribution ==
The type locality of this species is the northeast coast of New Zealand.
