= Zeacolpus capricornius =

Scientific classification
- Kingdom: Animalia
- Phylum: Mollusca
- Class: Gastropoda
- Subclass: Caenogastropoda
- Order: incertae sedis
- Family: Turritellidae
- Genus: Zeacolpus
- Species: Z. capricornius

Binomial name
- Zeacolpus capricornius (Garrard, 1972)

Species of gastropod

Zeacolpus capricornius is a species of sea snail, a marine gastropod mollusk in the family Turritellidae.
