= Uberella vitrea =

Scientific classification
- Kingdom: Animalia
- Phylum: Mollusca
- Class: Gastropoda
- Subclass: Caenogastropoda
- Order: Littorinimorpha
- Family: Naticidae
- Genus: Uberella
- Species: U. vitrea

Binomial name
- Uberella vitrea (Hutton, 1873)

Species of gastropod

Uberella vitrea is a species of sea snail, a marine gastropod mollusc in the family Naticidae, the moon snails.
