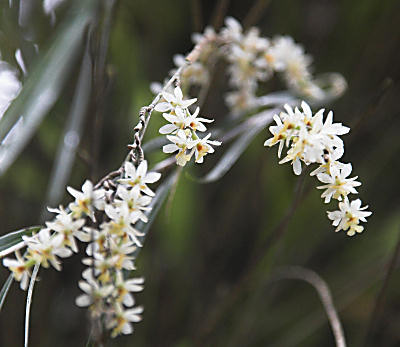
- Earina mucronata

Scientific classification
- Kingdom: Plantae
- Clade: Tracheophytes
- Clade: Angiosperms
- Clade: Monocots
- Order: Asparagales
- Family: Orchidaceae
- Subfamily: Epidendroideae
- Tribe: Epidendreae
- Subtribe: Agrostophyllinae
- Genus: Earina; Lindl., 1834

Type species
- Earina mucronata Lindl., 1834

= Earina =

Genus of orchids

Earina is a genus of orchids (family Orchidaceae). At the present time (June 2014), 7 species are recognized, native to various islands in the Pacific Ocean.

The New Zealand species are all epiphytic, or sometimes lithophytic, found growing on mossy trunks in the rain forests of both the North and South Islands. The strap-shaped leaves grow from pendulous wire-thin pseudobulbs that arise from creeping rhizomes. E. mucronata flowers mainly in the spring, whereas E. autumnalis, as its name suggests, flowers in the autumn—its flowers are fragrant. The flowers are tiny, typically less than 1 cm across, but are produced in abundance. A large flowering specimen in the bush looks spectacular.

== Species ==
1. Earina aestivalis Cheeseman. - New Zealand North Island
2. Earina autumnalis (G. Forst.) Hook.f. - New Zealand (North and South Islands, plus Chatham Island)
3. Earina deplanchei Rchb.f. - New Caledonia
4. Earina floripecten Kraenzl. - New Caledonia
5. Earina mucronata Lindl. - New Zealand (North and South Islands, plus Chatham Island)
6. Earina sigmoidea T.Hashim. - Vanuatu
7. Earina valida Rchb.f. - Vanuatu, New Caledonia, Fiji, Samoa
