= Northcraft =

Northcraft is an English surname. Notable people with the surname include:

- Aaron Northcraft (born 1990), American baseball pitcher
- Gregory Northcraft (fl. 1973–2009), American social psychologist
