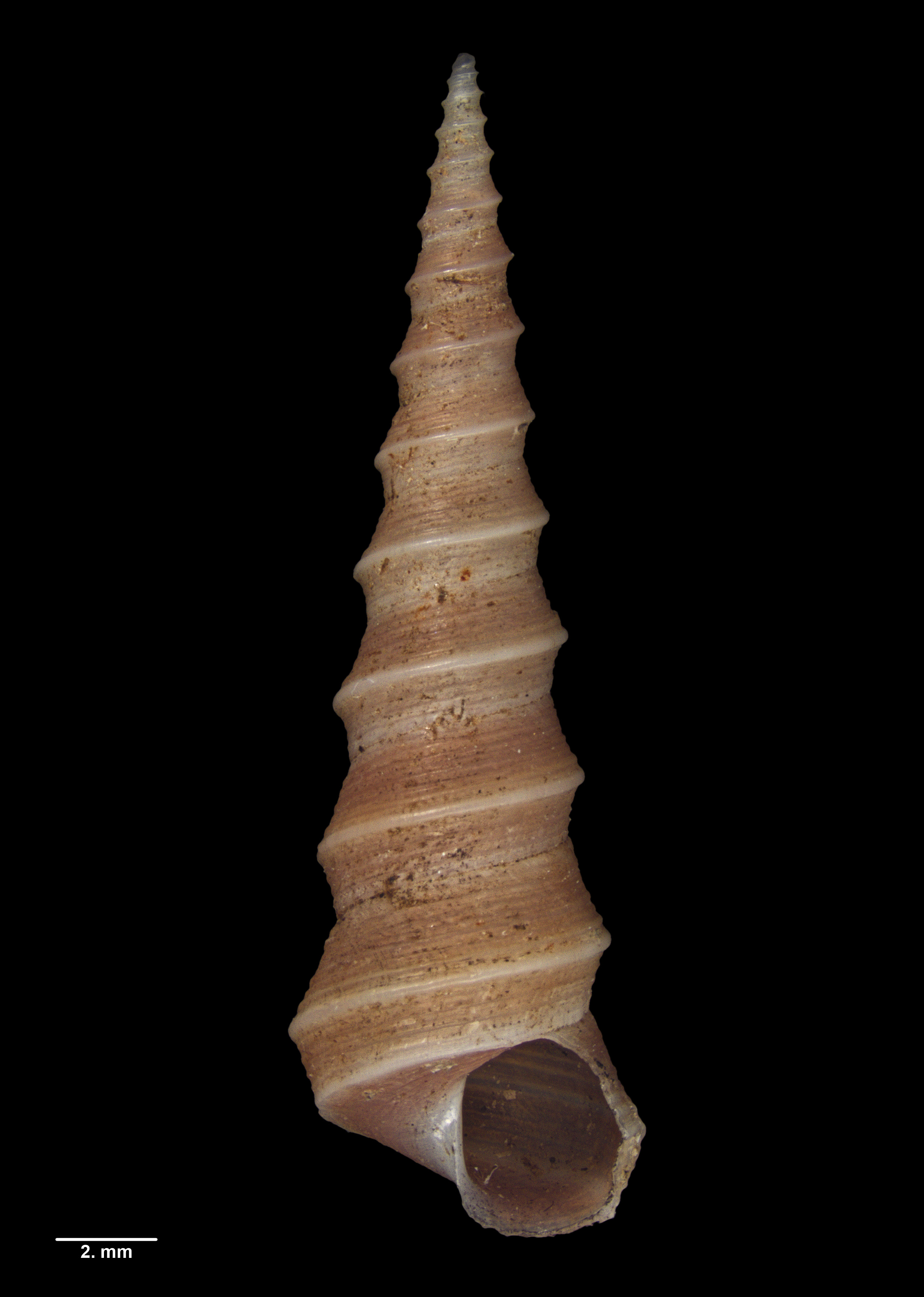
- Stiracolpus ahiparanus

Scientific classification
- Kingdom: Animalia
- Phylum: Mollusca
- Class: Gastropoda
- Subclass: Caenogastropoda
- Order: incertae sedis
- Family: Turritellidae
- Genus: Stiracolpus; Finlay, 1926

Type species
- Turritella symmetrica Hutton, 1873

Synonyms
- Zeacolpus (Stiracolpus) Finlay, 1926

= Stiracolpus =

Genus of gastropods

Stiracolpus is a genus of sea snails, marine gastropod mollusks in the family Turritellidae.

== Species ==
Species within the genus Stiracolpus include:

- Stiracolpus ahiparanus (Powell, 1927)
- † Stiracolpus hurunuiensis (Marwick, 1957)
- † Stiracolpus huttoni (Cossmann, 1912)
- Stiracolpus kaawaensis Laws, 1936
- Stiracolpus pagoda (Reeve, 1849)
- † Stiracolpus procellosus (Marwick, 1931)
- † Stiracolpus propagoda (Laws, 1940)
- † Stiracolpus quennelli (Marwick, 1957)
- Stiracolpus symmetricus (Hutton, 1873)
- † Stiracolpus vigilax (Marwick, 1957)
- † Stiracolpus wiltoni (Marwick, 1957)

Species brought into synonymy

- Stiracolpus blacki (Marwick, 1957): synonym of Stiracolpus pagoda (Reeve, 1849)
- Stiracolpus kimberi (Verco, 1908): synonym of Turritellopsis kimberi (Verco, 1908)
- † Stiracolpus nanulus (Marwick, 1957): synonym of Stiracolpus symmetricus (Hutton, 1873)
- † Stiracolpus ohopeus (Marwick, 1957): synonym of Stiracolpus pagoda (Reeve, 1849)
- Stiracolpus robinae (Marwick, 1957): synonym of Stiracolpus symmetricus (Hutton, 1873)
- Stiracolpus shepherdi (Marwick, 1957): synonym of Stiracolpus symmetricus (Hutton, 1873)
- Stiracolpus smithiana (Donald, 1900): synonym of Colpospira smithiana (Donald, 1900)
- Stiracolpus uttleyi (Marwick, 1957): synonym of Stiracolpus pagoda (Reeve, 1849)
- Stiracolpus waikopiroensis (Suter, 1917): synonym of Stiracolpus pagoda (Reeve, 1849)
