= Earle Northcroft =

New Zealand botanist and physician (1896–1962)

Earle Fead Northcroft (1896–1962) was a New Zealand botanist and physician who was a member of the 1924 Chatham Islands expedition scientific team.

== Early life ==
Northcroft was born in 1896 in Christchurch the only son of Ernest Northcroft. His cousin was the lawyer and judge Sir Erima Northcroft.

== Career ==
During WWI Northcroft served in the New Zealand Expeditionary Force receiving the British War Medal. His occupation at enlistment was law clerk. After the war he attended the University of Otago attaining an M.Sc. in 1924 with a thesis entitled An Ecological Study of the New Zealand Plants at Lawyers Head. He then lectured in biology at Otago before gaining a Ph.D. at Victoria University College in Wellington in 1931.

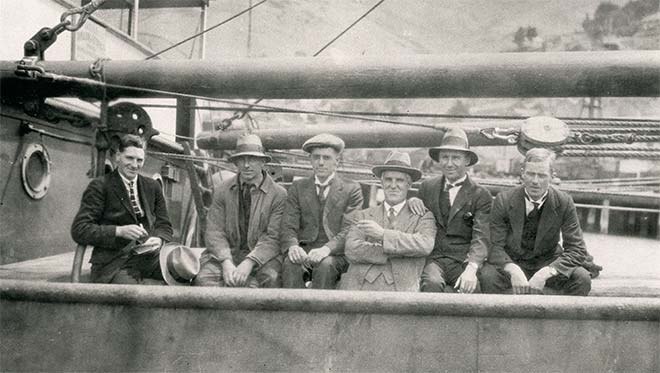
1924 Chatham Islands research expedition. Northcroft on the right.

Northcroft was a member of the Otago Institute and one of two botanists who made up the scientific team on the 1924 Chatham Islands expedition. His findings were unpublished until his records were discovered and published posthumously by A.J. Healy in 1975. He recorded 53 species that had not been recorded by later researchers but no specimens exist. Between 1923 and 1929, he worked on the biology of the blackberry publishing five papers and wool fibres publishing one paper.

Northcroft then changed careers studying medicine at the University of Edinburgh where he graduated with an MB, ChB in 1934. After qualifying he worked in the Royal Infirmary, Royal Hospital for Sick Children and City Fever Hospital in Edinburgh and in Hounslow Hospital in England.

In the late 1930s, he left the United Kingdom for Australia joining the medical branch of the Royal Australian Air Force during WWII. He ran an RAAF hospital in Sydney. In August 1947, he was appointed to the rank of Squadron Leader as a part-time physician specialist.

In 1949, he returned to Dunedin where he became a general practitioner and instructor at the Otago medical school.

== Personal life ==
Northcroft was a supporter of the arts belonging to the Dunedin Public Art Gallery Association and serving on the committee of the Otago Arts Society.

His wife Brenda Guthrie Northcroft wrote several books including a biography of her husband Another beloved physician.

He died in Dunedin, on 2 June 1962.
