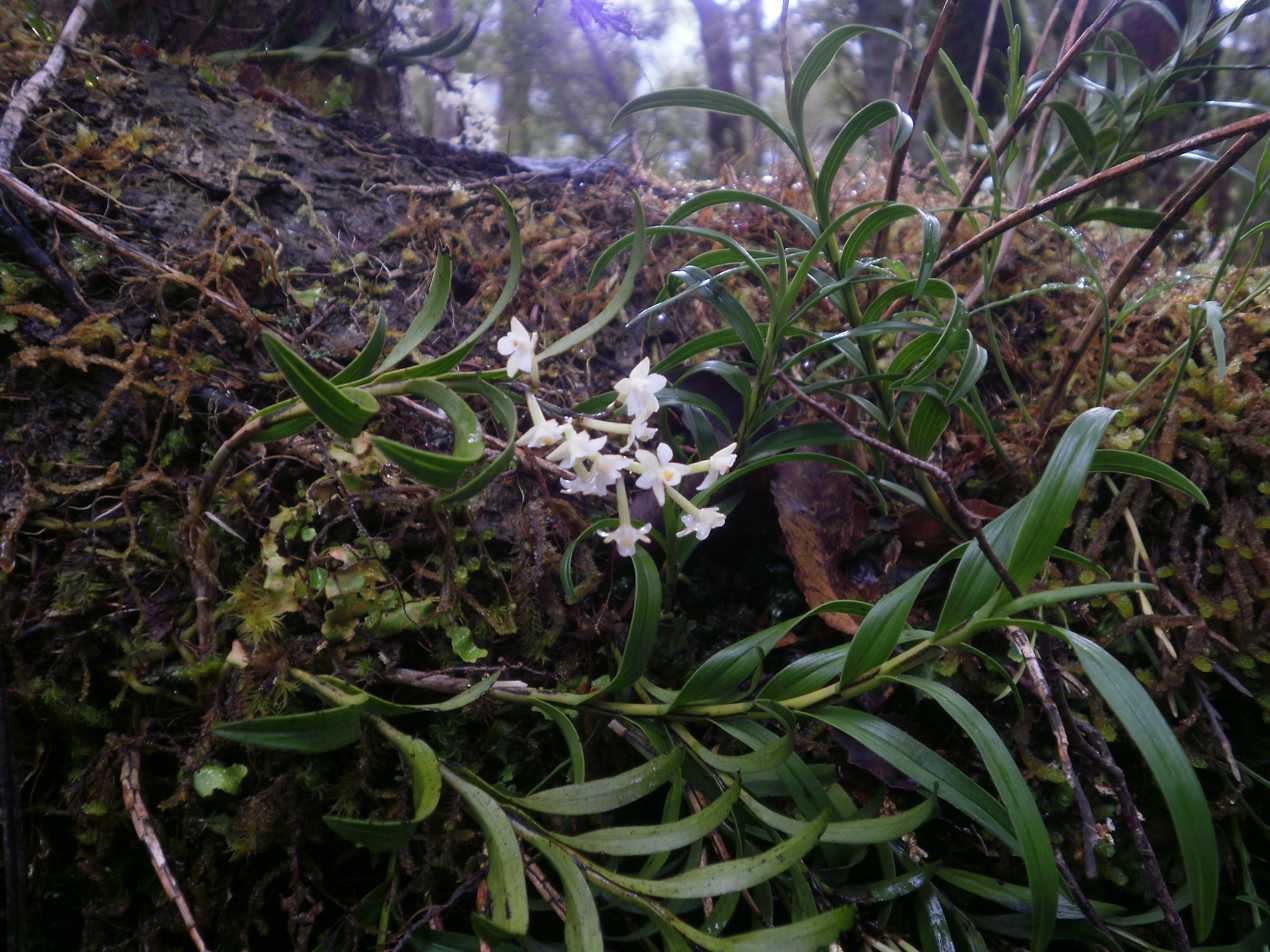

Scientific classification
- Kingdom: Plantae
- Clade: Tracheophytes
- Clade: Angiosperms
- Clade: Monocots
- Order: Asparagales
- Family: Orchidaceae
- Subfamily: Epidendroideae
- Genus: Earina
- Species: E. autumnalis

Binomial name
- Earina autumnalis (G.Forst.) Hook.f.

Synonyms
- Epidendrum autumnale G.Forst.; Cymbidium autumnale (G.Forst.) Sw.; Malaxis autumnalis (G.Forst.) Spreng.; Earina suaveolens Lindl.; Earina alba Colenso

= Earina autumnalis =

Species of orchid

Earina autumnalis, (commonly known as raupeka (Māori) or Easter orchid) is a species of orchid that is endemic to New Zealand (North and South Islands, plus Chatham Island). It typically blooms in autumn, or February-April in New Zealand. The blooms can be between 5 and 30cm long.

Its small white flowers produce a strong fragrance - a scent often compared to vanilla. It generally occurs as an epiphyte or lithophyte - in the former situation it frequently grows in close association with other endemic orchid species such as Winika cunninghamii. It is often found around lakes (such as Lake Manapouri) where the winters are warmer. The plant is frost tolerant but not by much, and relies on insulation from moss and other plants to protects it from harsher winters.
