= Hounslow Hospital =

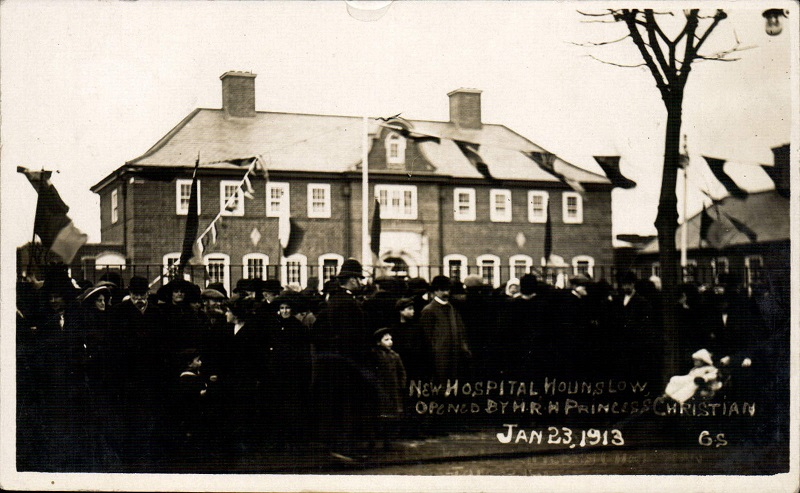
- Hounslow Hospital

- Location within Hounslow

Geography
- Location: Hounslow, London, England, United Kingdom
- Coordinates: 51.4679°N 0.3733°W

History
- Founded: 1875
- Closed: 1977

Links
- Lists: Hospitals in England

Hounslow Hospital was a small hospital for geriatric and long-stay patients situated in an industrial area of Hounslow, girdled by two motorways and Heathrow Airport. It was run by the Ealing, Hammersmith and Hounslow Area Health Authority.

== History ==
The hospital was founded by Dr. L. de B. Christian in 1875 and opened the following year. It moved to a new purpose-built building in Staines Road in 1913 and was extended in the 1920s. A new out-patients department and X-ray department were completed in 1927. It became part of the Emergency Medical Scheme during the Second World War.

In January 1977 the health authority announced the closure of the hospital with effect from August 1977. A work-in was organised which kept the hospital open for several months. In October 1977 the health authority forcibly removed the patients, but the occupation continued until November 1978. The matron’s office was occupied by the Fightback bulletin production team, the Assistant Matron’s office was used as headquarters for the West London Fire Brigades Union and Maple Ward became a ‘conference hall’ used by various local groups.

== Notable Staff ==
- Alice 'Ethel' Jacob, (1861- ), Matron 1897-1913. She worked at Chelsea Hospital for Women for six months before she trained at The London Hospital under Eva Luckes between 1887-1889. After her training she worked as a staff nurse for a year at The London.
