= Stiracolpus symmetricus =

Scientific classification
- Kingdom: Animalia
- Phylum: Mollusca
- Class: Gastropoda
- Subclass: Caenogastropoda
- Order: incertae sedis
- Family: Turritellidae
- Genus: Stiracolpus
- Species: S. symmetricus

Binomial name
- Stiracolpus symmetricus (Hutton, 1873)

Synonyms
- Stiracolpus delli granti (Marwick, 1957); Stiracolpus delli murdochi (Marwick, 1957); Stiracolpus delli vellae (Marwick, 1957); † Stiracolpus nanulus (Marwick, 1957); Stiracolpus robinae (Marwick, 1957); Stiracolpus shepherdi (Marwick, 1957); Turritella (Colpospira) godeffroyana Donald, 1900; Turritella (Eglisia) symetrica Hutton, 1873 (Original combination); Turritella chordata Suter, 1908; Turritella symmetrica Hutton, 1873; Zeacolpus symmetricus (Hutton, 1873)

Species of gastropod

Stiracolpus symmetricus, common name : the small turret, is a species of sea snail, a marine gastropod mollusk in the family Turritellidae.

== Description ==
The shell grows to a length of 11 mm.

== Distribution ==
This marine species is endemic to New Zealand.
