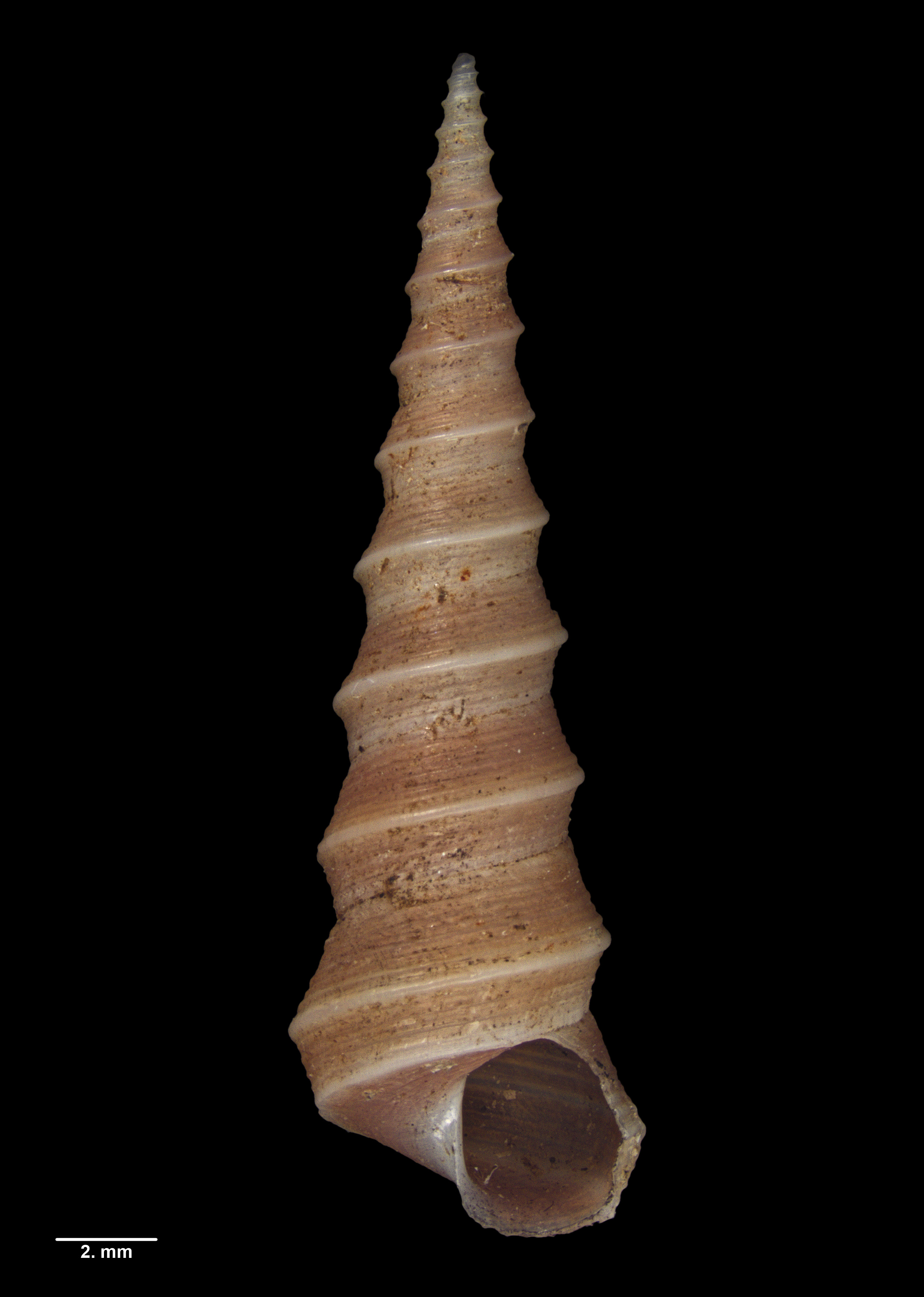

Scientific classification
- Kingdom: Animalia
- Phylum: Mollusca
- Class: Gastropoda
- Subclass: Caenogastropoda
- Order: incertae sedis
- Family: Turritellidae
- Genus: Stiracolpus
- Species: S. ahiparanus

Binomial name
- Stiracolpus ahiparanus (Powell, 1927)

Synonyms
- Zeacolpus ahiparanus Powell, 1927

= Stiracolpus ahiparanus =

Species of gastropod

Stiracolpus ahiparanus, common name : the keeled screw shell, is a species of small sea snail, a marine gastropod mollusc in the family Turritellidae.

== Description ==
The shell grows to a length of 25 mm.

== Distribution ==
This marine species is endemic to New Zealand.
