= Nancy Northcroft =

New Zealand town planner

- Born: 23 March 1913; New Zealand
- Died: 31 July 1980 (aged 67)
- Occupations: Architect and Town planner
- Awards: Order of the British Empire

Anna Holmes "Nancy" Northcroft OBE (23 March 1913 – 31 July 1980) was a New Zealand architect and town planner. She was only the fourth woman to qualify as an architect in New Zealand. Northcroft won a 12-month British Council Empire Scholarship for Women, and travelled to England in 1942 to study town planning. Following her return to New Zealand, in 1949 she took up a position as town planning officer at the Christchurch City Council. In 1954 she was appointed as the founding chief executive of the Christchurch Regional Planning Authority (CRPA). In the later part of her career from 1963 to 1977, she worked in private practice for a Christchurch-based consultancy. She was awarded a Fellowship of the New Zealand Institute of Architects in 1966 and is the first known woman to receive this honour. In 1978 she was recognised with the inaugural gold medal award from the New Zealand Planning Institute, and was also awarded an OBE for services to town planning.

== Early life ==
Northcroft was born in Hamilton, New Zealand, on 23 March 1913. Her father was lawyer and later Supreme Court judge Erima Northcroft. Northcroft attended Diocesan School for Girls, Auckland, where she was head prefect.

== Career ==
Northcroft completed a degree in architecture at Auckland University College, graduating with a BArch in 1940. She was only the fourth woman to qualify as an architect, and was at that time the only woman architect from the South Island. Following graduation, she worked in Auckland for 16 months for the architects M. K Draffin and R. A Lippincott. She then moved to Christchurch, and worked for the Christchurch City Council and the Canterbury Education Board. In 1942, she won a 12-month British Council Empire Scholarship for Women. There were only four women offered Empire Scholarships in that year, and Northcroft was the first architect to be awarded one. She travelled to England in 1942, during World War II, to study town planning. In 1942, Northcroft gained an honours diploma in town planning at the School of Planning and Research, London.

In 1943, Northcroft took part in a broadcast as part of "Calling New Zealand" on the BBC Pacific shortwave radio programme, and discussed the application of English village concepts to town planning in New Zealand. She remained in England after the end of her scholarship, and from 1943 to 1946 she worked on surveys for the Association for Planning and Regional Reconstruction, based in London. She also taught correspondence courses for members of the armed forces to assist them in working towards membership of the Town Planning Institute.

She returned to New Zealand in 1947 after the end of the war, and in 1949 was appointed town planning officer at the Christchurch City Council. In 1950, she delivered an address to the National Council of Women about the provision of housing for older people. In 1954 she was promoted to chief planner. Northcroft was the founding chief executive of the Christchurch Regional Planning Authority (CRPA). In 1957, she warned about the dangers of urban sprawl in Christchurch and the associated increasing costs of transport, power, water and drainage. She gave an address at a school prize-giving in 1959, setting out some of her thoughts about planning for the future of the city. One of her significant achievements was the implementation of a "green belt" around the city, as part of the 1959 CRPA scheme. She also had a leading role in the development of a master transport plan for Christchurch. Whilst initially sceptical of motorways, transport modelling convinced her that urban motorways would be beneficial for Christchurch; those motorways were never built, though.

In the later part of her career from 1963 to 1977, she worked in private practice for the Christchurch-based consultancy Davie Lovell-Smith. From 1967 to 1969, Northcroft was the president of the New Zealand Institute of Professional Town and Country Planners.

== Personal life ==
Northcroft was active in leadership in a wide range of community groups. In 1952, she was president of the Victoria League Young Contingent. She was elected President of the Canterbury Branch of the New Zealand Geographical Society in 1956. In 1960 she was the President of Canterbury Branch of the Federation of University Women, and in 1967 she was a committee member of Friends of Te Wai Pounamu Māori Girls College, and a representative on the school board of governors. She was also a Justice of the Peace, a president of the Soroptimist Club of Christchurch, and a member of a committee of the Diocese of Christchurch. Northcroft was a keen cricket player and in 1971 she was made a life member of the Riccarton Cricket Club.

She remained single throughout her life, and died at Princess Margaret Hospital on 31 July 1980.

== Honours and awards ==
Northcroft was awarded a Fellowship of the New Zealand Institute of Architects in 1966. She is the first known woman to receive this honour.

In 1978 Northcroft was awarded the inaugural Gold Medal of the New Zealand Planning Institute.

In the 1978 New Year Honours, Northcroft was appointed an Officer of the Order of the British Empire, for services to town planning.

In 1994, the New Zealand Planning Institute established the Nancy Northcroft Planning Practice Award in her honour.
