= Erima Northcroft =

New Zealand lawyer, judge and military leader

The Honourable Sir Erima Northcroft DSO VD
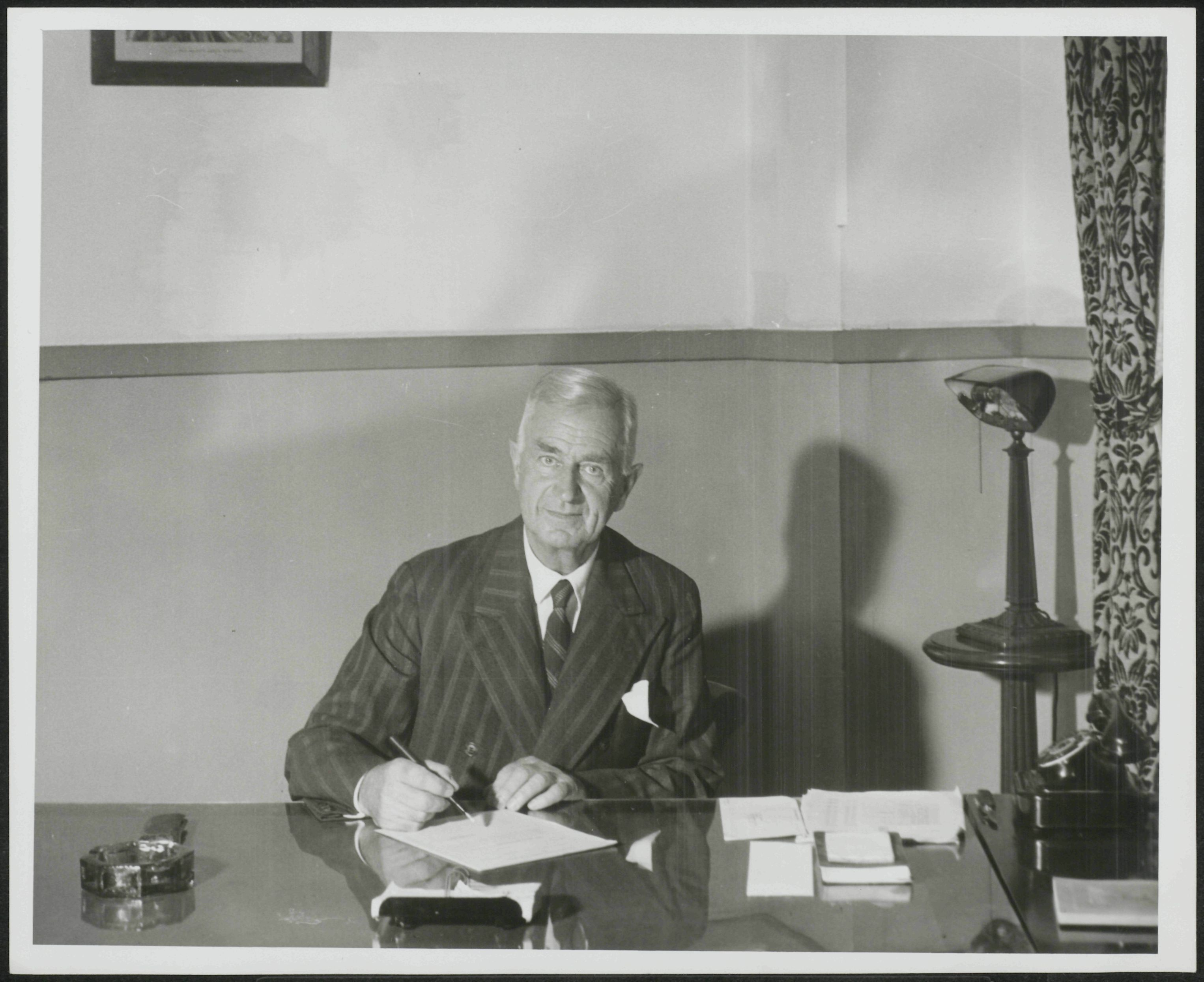
- Born: Erima Harvey Northcroft; 2 December 1884; Hokitika, New Zealand
- Died: 10 October 1953 (aged 68); Christchurch, New Zealand
- Education: Auckland University College
- Spouse: Violet Constance Mitchell (m. 1908)
- Children: 2 daughters
- Relatives: Nancy Northcroft (daughter)

Sir Erima Harvey Northcroft DSO VD (2 December 1884 – 10 October 1953) was a New Zealand lawyer, judge, and military leader. His papers from the Tokyo War Crimes Trial are held by the University of Canterbury.

== Biography ==
Northcroft was born in Hokitika, New Zealand. He attended Auckland University College and began his law practice in Hamilton. In 1912, Northcroft was a founding member of the Hamilton District Law Society and later became its president.

During World War I, Northcroft was an artillery officer in the New Zealand Expeditionary Force, and was awarded the Distinguished Service Order in the 1919 King's Birthday Honours. The same year he returned to New Zealand, resumed his law practice, and joined an Auckland law firm in 1923. From 1927 to 1933, Northcroft was a deputy judge advocate general in the New Zealand Army and from 1933 to 1935 was a Judge Advocate General.

He was awarded the King George V Silver Jubilee Medal in 1935. Also in 1935, Northcroft was appointed a judge of the Supreme Court of New Zealand at Christchurch, a superior trial court. In his court, he was styled "The Honourable Mr Justice Northcroft".

After the Second World War, Northcroft was appointed as the New Zealand judge on the International Military Tribunal for the Far East in Tokyo. In recognition of this service, Northcroft was appointed a Knight Bachelor in the 1949 King's Birthday Honours. After returning from Japan, he resumed sitting as a Supreme Court judge, and occasionally sat as a judge of the New Zealand Court of Appeal. In 1953, Northcroft was awarded the Queen Elizabeth II Coronation Medal.

Northcroft died in Christchurch on 10 October 1953. He had married Violet Constance Mitchell in Auckland in 1908, and the couple had two daughters. One of his daughters was town planner Nancy Northcroft. The botanist and physician Earle Northcroft was his cousin.

After his death his papers went to the Justice Erima Harvey Northcroft Tokyo War Crimes Trial Collection at the University of Canterbury, which was added to the Asia Pacific regional section of the UNESCO Memory of the World Register in 2010.
