= Gregory Northcraft =

American social psychologist

Gregory B. Northcraft is an American social psychologist.

While Northcraft attended Dartmouth College, he spent a portion of 1973 working for the United States Information Agency's Foreign Information Service. He graduated with Bachelor of Arts degrees in psychology and Russian language and literature in 1975. Northcraft earned a second Bachelor of Arts degree in experimental psychology in 1977 from the University of Oxford, and worked for the Office of the Commissioner of Education in the same year. As a master's and doctoral student of social psychology at Stanford University, Northcraft spent part of 1979 with the Office of Consumer Studies within the Food and Drug Administration.

After completing his graduate studies in 1981, Northcraft began his career at the University of Arizona as an assistant professor of management and public policy. He was successively promoted to an associate and full professorship in 1987 and 1991, respectively. In 1996, Northcraft joined the University of Illinois Urbana-Champaign faculty, where he served as Harry J. Gray Professor of Executive Leadership from 2001 to 2009. In 2008, Northcraft became director of the Office of Research, while also serving as interim associate dean of faculty for the University of Illinois College of Business. Before Northcraft retired in 2009, he held the full-time associate deanship.
