= John Marwick =

New Zealand palaeontologist and geologist (1891–1978)

- Born: 3 February 1891; Maheno, New Zealand
- Died: 17 August 1978 (aged 87); Hastings, New Zealand
- Education: University of Otago
- Known for: Classification of molluscs
- Spouse: Marion Ivy Mary Keys
- Children: 2 sons, 2 daughters
- Awards: Hamilton Memorial Prize, Hector Memorial Medal, Hutton Memorial Medal
- Scientific career
- Fields: Palaeontology, geology
- Workplaces: University of Otago

John Marwick MM (3 February 1891 – 17 August 1978) was a New Zealand palaeontologist and geologist.

== Early life and family ==
Marwick was born in Maheno, New Zealand, on 3 February 1891, the son of Hugh Marwick, and his wife, Jane née Cuthbert. While at Waitaki Boys' High School he helped to collect fossil shells and learned the beginnings of how to classify molluscs. He studied and taught at the University of Otago, and in 1912 gained an MA with first-class honours in with a thesis on geology. In 1915, he married Marion Ivy Mary Keys at Mosgiel. They had two sons and two daughters, all becoming science graduates.

== Career ==
With the coming of the First World War Marwick joined the New Zealand Medical Corps in 1916, and was posted to Egypt. He served there as a medical orderly in the New Zealand Division, and also in Palestine, Sinai and Jordan. He won the Military Medal, and returned to Egypt, where he remained until 1919.

In 1920 he became an assistant geologist in the New Zealand Geological Survey. As the only Geological Survey palaeontologist, Marwick named most of the common New Zealand Tertiary fossils, as well as many rarer ones. His work on molluscs were important contributions to understanding the Cenozoic-era connections and environments. He continued work with oil companies in this field after he retired.

Marwick was a geologist and palaeontologist on the 1924 Chatham Islands Expedition.

From 1937, still in the Geological Survey, Marwick entered into a fifteen-year collaboration with Harold Finlay. He persuaded Finlay to shift his focus from molluscs to forams. The result of this collaboration was the integration of Finlay's foram work with Marwick's stratigraphy and mollusc work. They jointly produced a schema of New Zealand Cenozoic rocks that survives to the present almost without modification.

Marwick retired in 1952. He continued to work from home in what became a highly productive period. Apart from his work with oil companies, he took to completion research on turritellid gastropods and New Zealand faunal studies. He made significant contributions to geomorphology and Mesozoic palaeontology, as well as volcanology and stratigraphy. His bibliography contains 124 publications.

John Marwick died at Hastings on 17 August 1978.

== Honours and awards ==
- Awarded Hamilton Memorial Prize jointly with Finlay
- 1933 – awarded Hector Memorial Medal and Prize (with Noel Benson)
- 1935 – appointed Fellow of the Royal Society of New Zealand
- 1937 to 1938 – chairman, geology section of the Wellington Philosophical Society
- 1938 to 1946 – editor of the Transactions and Proceedings of the Royal Society of New Zealand
- 1944 to 1950 – on the council of the Royal Society of New Zealand
- 1950 to 1952 – vice president of the Royal Society of New Zealand
- 1953 – Hutton Memorial Medal
