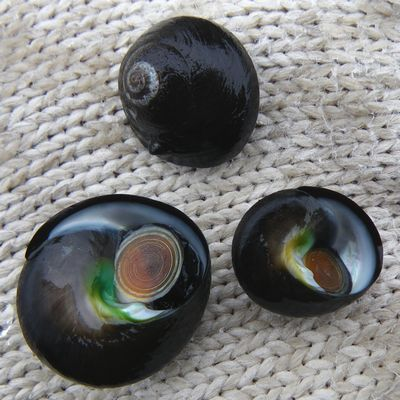
- Three live but retracted individuals of Chlorostoma xanthostigma.

Scientific classification
- Kingdom: Animalia
- Phylum: Mollusca
- Class: Gastropoda
- Subclass: Vetigastropoda
- Order: Trochida
- Superfamily: Trochoidea
- Family: Tegulidae
- Genus: Chlorostoma; Swainson, 1840

= Chlorostoma =

Genus of gastropods

Chlorostoma is a genus of sea snails, marine gastropod mollusks in the family Tegulidae.

== Description ==
The solid, conical shell is umbilicate or imperforate. The spire is elevated or depressed. The oblique aperture is subrhomboidal. The outer lip is smooth within. The arcuate columella is above continued in a callus over or halfway around the umbilicus, which when open shows one or more spiral ribs inside. The base of the columella shows two or more denticles.

== Species ==
Species within the genus Chlorostoma include:

- Chlorostoma argyrostomum (Gmelin, 1791)
- Chlorostoma lischkei (Tapparone-Canefri, 1874)
- Chlorostoma xanthostigma A. Adams, 1853

Species brought into synonymy

- Chlorostoma achates Gould, 1861: synonym of Tegula pfeifferi (Philiippi, 1846)
- Chlorostoma argyrostoma lischkei (Tapparone-Canefri, C.E., 1874): synonym of Chlorostoma lischkei (Tapparone-Canefri, 1874)
- Chlorostoma atra (Lesson, R.P., 1830): synonym of Tegula atra (Lesson, 1830)
- Chlorostoma barkeri Bartsch, P. & H.A. Rehder, 1939: synonym of Tegula snodgrassi (Pilsbry & Vanatta, 1902)
- Chlorostoma brunnea (Philippi, 1848): synonym of Tegula brunnea (Philippi, 1849)
- Chlorostoma cooksoni (Smith, 1877): synonym of Tegula cooksoni (Smith, 1877)
- Chlorostoma coronulatum C. B. Adams, Pilsbry, 1889: synonym of Tegula mariana (Dall, 1919)
- Chlorostoma euryomphalus (Jonas, 1844): synonym of Tegula euryomphala (Jonas, 1844)
- Chlorostoma excavata Lamarck, 1822: synonym of Tegula excavata (Lamarck, 1822)
- Chlorostoma fasciata Born, 1778: synonym of Tegula fasciata (Born, 1778)
- Chlorostoma funebrale A. Adams, 1855: synonym of Tegula funebralis (A. Adams, 1855)
- Chlorostoma funebralis (A. Adams, 1855): synonym of Tegula funebralis (A. Adams, 1855)
- Chlorostoma gallina Forbes, 1850: synonym of Tegula gallina (Forbes, 1850)
- Chlorostoma impressum Jonas: synonym of Tegula corvus (Philippi, 1850)
- Chlorostoma luctuosum (d'Orbigny, 1841): synonym of Tegula luctuosa (d'Orbigny, 1841)
- Chlorostoma melaleucos (Jonas, 1844): synonym of Tegula melaleucos (Jonas, 1844)
- Chlorostoma montereyi (Kiener, 1850): synonym of Tegula montereyi (Kiener, 1850)
- Chlorostoma nigricolor Dunker, R.W., 1860: synonym of Chlorostoma xanthostigma A. Adams, 1853
- Chlorostoma orbignyana Pilsbry, H.A., 1900: synonym of Tegula patagonica (Orbigny, A.V.M.D. d', 1835)
- Chlorostoma panamensis (Philippi, 1849): synonym of Tegula panamensis (Philippi, 1849)
- Chlorostoma pellisserpentis (Wood, 1828): synonym of Tegula pellisserpentis (Wood, 1828)
- Chlorostoma pfeifferi (Philippi, 1846): synonym of Tegula pfeifferi (Philiippi, 1846)
- Chlorostoma pulligo (Gmelin, 1791): synonym of Tegula pulligo (Gmelin, 1791)
- Chlorostoma quadricostatum (W. Wood, 1828): synonym of Tegula quadricostata (W. Wood, 1828)
- Chlorostoma rugosum A. Adams, 1851: synonym of Tegula rugosa (A. Adams, 1851)
- Chlorostoma scalaris Philippi, 1844: synonym of Tegula lividomaculata (C. B. Adams, 1845)
- Chlorostoma snodgrassi (Pilsbry, H.A. & E.G. Vanatta, 1902): synonym of Tegula snodgrassi (Pilsbry & Vanatta, 1902)
- Chlorostoma tridentata (Potiez, V.L.V. & A.L.G. Michaud, 1838): synonym of Tegula tridentata (Potiez & Michaud, 1838)
- Chlorostoma tropidophorum A. Adams, 1851: synonym of Tegula luctuosa (d'Orbigny, 1841)
- Chlorostoma turbinatum A. Adams: synonym of Tegula lividomaculata (C. B. Adams, 1845)
- Chlorostoma viridulum (Gmelin, 1791): synonym of Tegula viridula (Gmelin, 1791)
