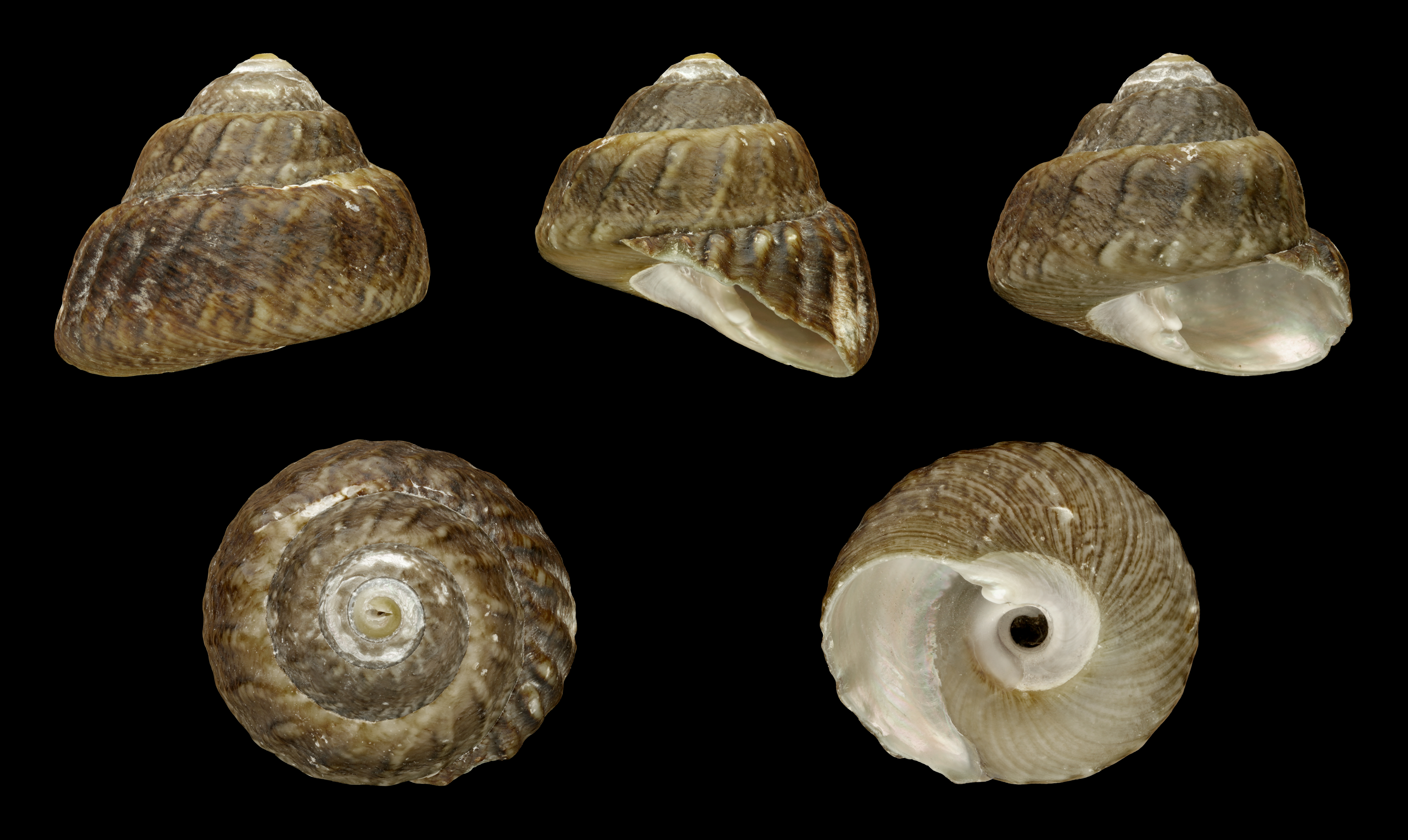
- Omphalius rusticus (Gmelin, 1791)

Scientific classification
- Kingdom: Animalia
- Phylum: Mollusca
- Class: Gastropoda
- Subclass: Vetigastropoda
- Order: Trochida
- Superfamily: Trochoidea
- Family: Tegulidae
- Genus: Omphalius; Philippi, 1847

Type species
- Trochus rusticus Gmelin, 1791

= Omphalius =

Genus of gastropods

Omphalius is a genus of sea snails, marine gastropod mollusks in the family Tegulidae.

Since 2020 it is considered a synonym of Tegula Lesson, 1832

== Species ==
Species brought into synonymy:

- Omphalius caelatus Adams A., 1854: synonym of Anadema macandrewii (Mörch, 1868)
- Omphalius globulus Carpenter, 1857: synonym of Tegula globulus (Carpenter, 1857)
- Omphalius marianus Dall, 1919: synonym of Tegula mariana (Dall, 1919)
- Omphalius nigerrimus (Gmelin, 1791): synonym of Tegula nigerrima (Gmelin, 1791)
- Omphalius rusticus (Gmelin, 1791): synonym of Tegula rustica (Gmelin, 1791)
