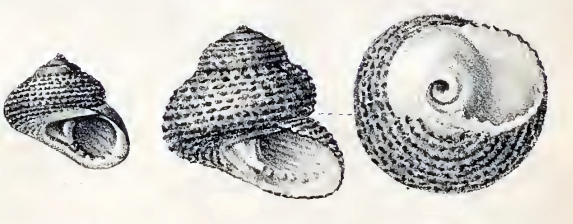
- Three views of a shell of Tegula ligulata

Scientific classification
- Kingdom: Animalia
- Phylum: Mollusca
- Class: Gastropoda
- Subclass: Vetigastropoda
- Order: Trochida
- Family: Tegulidae
- Genus: Tegula
- Species: T. ligulata

Binomial name
- Tegula ligulata (Menke, 1850)

Synonyms
- Chlorostoma viridulum var. ligulatum (Menke, 1850); Omphalius fuscescens Carpenter; Omphalius ligulatus Carpenter; Tegula (Agathistoma) ligulata (Menke, 1850); Trochus ligulatus Menke, 1850 (original description)

= Tegula ligulata =

Species of gastropod

Tegula ligulata is a species of sea snail, a marine gastropod mollusk in the family Tegulidae.

Subspecies

- Tegula ligulata ligulata (Menke, 1850). It is sometimes considered a synonym of Tegula eiseni (Jordan, 1936)
- Tegula ligulata mariamadre Pilsbry & Lowe, 1932 (synonym: Tegula (Agathistoma) mariana mariamadre Pilsbry, H.A. & H.N. Lowe, 1932)

== Description ==
The height of the shell attains 22 mm, and its diameter is also 22 mm. This is an extremely variable form. The shell may be either very much depressed or as high as broad. It may be spirally sculptured with numerous narrow, unequal lirae, or as strongly cingulate as the preceding form. The best development of this variety is shown by the specimens from San Diego. They are elevated, turbinated, strongly granose-lirate. The base of the shell is deeply eroded in front of the aperture. The color is brownish-yellow, with numerous close narrow longitudinal purplish-brown stripes, but the whole surface is so dingy that it appears unicolored. The spiral lirae are subequal, the grains low and elongated in the direction of the lirae. The whorls are rounder than in Tegula viridula and the aperture decidedly smaller, and lacking a green tinge on the columella.

It is usually encrusted with bryozoa or Serpula.

== Distribution ==
This species occurs in the Pacific Ocean from Southern California to Peru.
