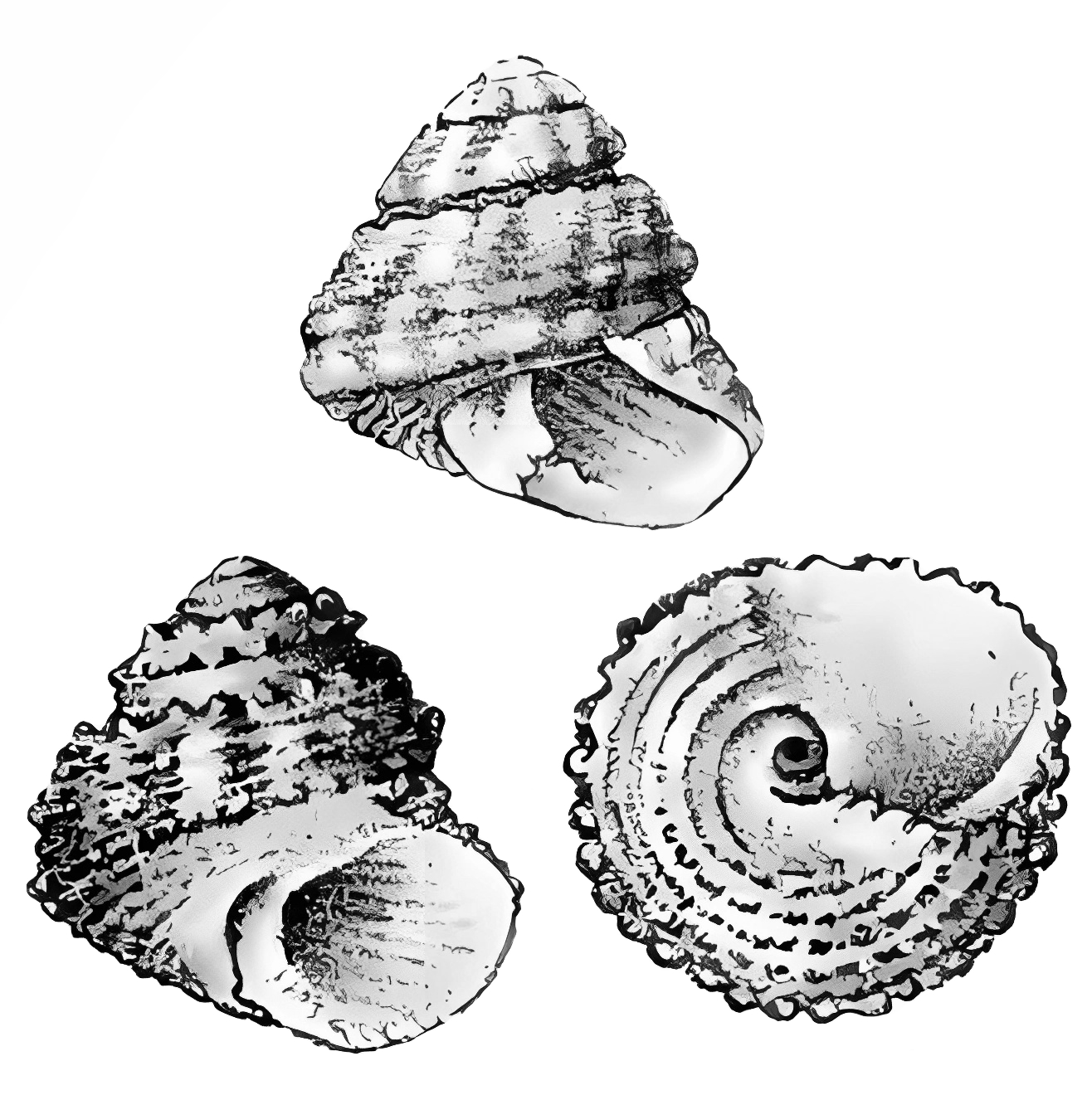
- Drawing with three views of a shell of Tegula rubroflammulata

Scientific classification
- Kingdom: Animalia
- Phylum: Mollusca
- Class: Gastropoda
- Subclass: Vetigastropoda
- Order: Trochida
- Family: Tegulidae
- Genus: Tegula
- Species: T. rubroflammulata

Binomial name
- Tegula rubroflammulata (Koch in Philippi, 1843)

Synonyms
- Trochus rubroflammulatus Koch in Philippi, 1843

= Tegula rubroflammulata =

Species of gastropod

Tegula rubroflammulata is a species of sea snail, a marine gastropod mollusk in the family Tegulidae.

== Description ==
The size of the shell varies between 10 mm and 18 mm. This form is similar in general appearance and form to Tegula quadricostata. The spire is either elevated or rather depressed. The sutures are deeply canaliculate. The body whorl is encircled by three prominent, equidistant carinae, one subsutural, composed of rounded or radiating knobs followed by two or three beaded lirulae, two at the periphery, prominently beaded, with a beaded riblet between them. The base of the shell is encircled by 5 more or less beaded, equal lirae. The entire surface is microscopically obliquely striate, and in some places decussated by microscopic spiral striae. The oblique aperture is rounded-quadrate. The thick outer lip is lirate within. The columella is less deeply sinuous than in T. quadricostata, arcuate, tridentate below. The umbilicus is narrower than that of T. quadricostata. The color of the shell is whitish, radiately striped above with pink, the ribs of the base dotted or articulated with pink.

== Distribution ==
This species occurs in the Caribbean Sea; in the Pacific Ocean from Costa Rica to Panama.
