= Tegula verdispira =

Scientific classification
- Kingdom: Animalia
- Phylum: Mollusca
- Class: Gastropoda
- Subclass: Vetigastropoda
- Order: Trochida
- Family: Tegulidae
- Genus: Tegula
- Species: T. verdispira

Binomial name
- Tegula verdispira McLean, 1970

Synonyms
- Tegula (Agathistoma) verdispira McLean, 1970

Species of gastropod

Tegula verdispira is a species of sea snail, a marine gastropod mollusk in the family Tegulidae.

== Distribution ==
This species occurs in the Pacific Ocean off Islas Tres Marias, Mexico
