= Tegula kusairo =

Scientific classification
- Kingdom: Animalia
- Phylum: Mollusca
- Class: Gastropoda
- Subclass: Vetigastropoda
- Order: Trochida
- Family: Tegulidae
- Genus: Tegula
- Species: T. kusairo

Binomial name
- Tegula kusairo Yamazaki, Hirano, Chiba & Fukuda, 2020

Species of gastropod

Tegula kusairo is a species of edible marine snail discovered in the year 2020 in Japan by Yamazaki, Hirano, Chiba & Fukuda. The species was verified by Tohoku University and Okayama University.
