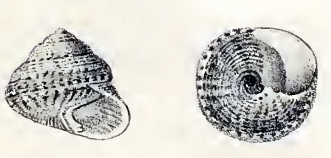
- Drawing with two views of a shell of Tegula hotessieriana

Scientific classification
- Kingdom: Animalia
- Phylum: Mollusca
- Class: Gastropoda
- Subclass: Vetigastropoda
- Order: Trochida
- Family: Tegulidae
- Genus: Tegula
- Species: T. hotessieriana

Binomial name
- Tegula hotessieriana (Orbigny, 1842)

Synonyms
- Chlorostoma maculostriata Adams, 1845; Chlorostoma maculostriatum Adams, 1845; Monodonta maculostriata Adams, 1845; Neomphalius maculostriata Adams, 1845; Trochus hotessierianus Orbigny, 1842 (original description); Trochus maculostriatus Philippi

= Tegula hotessieriana =

Species of gastropod

Tegula hotessieriana is a species of sea snail, a marine gastropod mollusk in the family Tegulidae.

== Description ==
The size of the shell varies between 5 mm and 13 mm. The solid, umbilicate shell has a conical shape. It is deep green, brown, pinkish or olivaceous, more or less dotted with white and a self-color, sometimes radiately flammulated with white. A tract around the umbilicus is white, tessellated with brown. The spire is elevated, sometimes scalariform. The apex acute. The upper whorls are slightly convex. The body whorl is convex, depressed below the suture and, rounded at the periphery. The whole surface bears numerous low, smooth spiral striae, which are often subobsolete on the body whorl, and it is then nearly smooth. The base of the shell is concave in the middle. The aperture is rounded-quadrate, smooth within or finely lirate. The columella is slightly sinuous, bidentate at base, expanding in a callus above, which slightly impinges upon the umbilicus.

== Distribution ==
This species occurs in the Caribbean Sea, the Gulf of Mexico, off the Lesser Antilles; in the Atlantic Ocean along the Mid-Atlantic Ridge and off Brazil.
