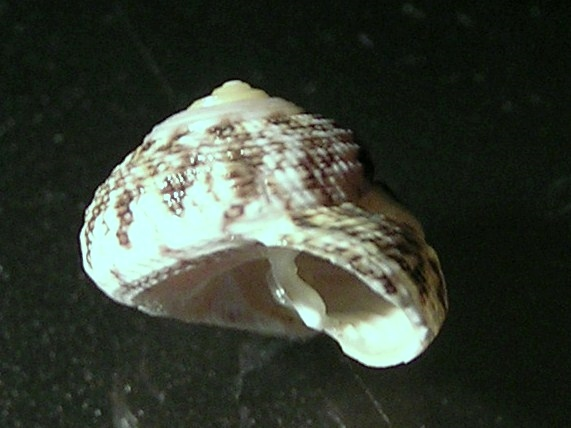
- View of a shell of Tegula picta

Scientific classification
- Kingdom: Animalia
- Phylum: Mollusca
- Class: Gastropoda
- Subclass: Vetigastropoda
- Order: Trochida
- Family: Tegulidae
- Genus: Tegula
- Species: T. picta

Binomial name
- Tegula picta McLean, 1970

Synonyms
- Tegula (Agathistoma) picta McLean, 1970

= Tegula picta =

Species of gastropod

Tegula picta is a species of sea snail, a marine gastropod mollusk in the family Tegulidae.

== Description ==
The shells of most species of sea snails are spirally coiled. The height of the shell is 18.5 mm, its diameter 20.2 mm.

== Distribution ==
This species occurs in the Pacific Ocean from Ecuador to Peru.
