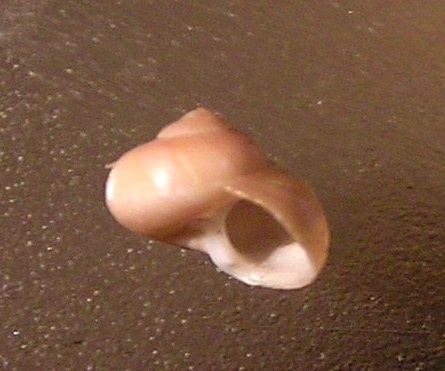
- Shell of Carolesia blakei

Scientific classification
- Kingdom: Animalia
- Phylum: Mollusca
- Class: Gastropoda
- Subclass: Vetigastropoda
- Order: Trochida
- Superfamily: Trochoidea
- Family: Tegulidae
- Genus: Carolesia
- Species: C. blakei

Binomial name
- Carolesia blakei (Clench & Aguayo, 1938)

Synonyms
- Calliostoma blakei Clench & Aguayo, 1938 (original combination); Photinula blakei (Clench & Aguayo, 1938)

= Carolesia blakei =

Species of gastropod

Carolesia blakei is a species of sea snail, a marine gastropod mollusk in the family Tegulidae.
