= Tegula corteziana =

Scientific classification
- Kingdom: Animalia
- Phylum: Mollusca
- Class: Gastropoda
- Subclass: Vetigastropoda
- Order: Trochida
- Family: Tegulidae
- Genus: Tegula
- Species: T. corteziana

Binomial name
- Tegula corteziana McLean, 1970

Synonyms
- Tegula (Agathistoma) corteziana McLean, 1970

Species of gastropod

Tegula corteziana is a species of sea snail, a marine gastropod mollusk in the family Tegulidae.

== Description ==
The shell is roughly 10.5 mm long, with a diameter of 12.4 mm.

== Distribution ==
This species is found in the Pacific Ocean off the coast of Mexico.
