= Tegula bergeroni =

Scientific classification
- Kingdom: Animalia
- Phylum: Mollusca
- Class: Gastropoda
- Subclass: Vetigastropoda
- Order: Trochida
- Family: Tegulidae
- Genus: Tegula
- Species: T. bergeroni

Binomial name
- Tegula bergeroni McLean, 1970

Synonyms
- Tegula (Agathistoma) bergeroni McLean, 1970

Species of gastropod

Tegula bergeroni is a species of sea snail, a marine gastropod mollusk in the family Tegulidae.

== Description ==
The length of the shell attains 13.4 mm, its diameter 14.4 mm.

== Distribution ==
This marine species occurs in the Pacific Ocean off Colombia.
