= Tegula puntagordana =

Scientific classification
- Kingdom: Animalia
- Phylum: Mollusca
- Class: Gastropoda
- Subclass: Vetigastropoda
- Order: Trochida
- Family: Tegulidae
- Genus: Tegula
- Species: T. puntagordana

Binomial name
- Tegula puntagordana Weisbord, 1962

Synonyms
- Tegula phalera Weisbord, 1962; Tegula trilirata Weisbord, 1962; Tegula (Agathistoma) puntagordana Weisbord, 1962

Species of gastropod

Tegula puntagordana is a species of sea snail, a marine gastropod mollusk in the family Tegulidae.

== Description ==
The size of the shell attains 16 mm.

== Distribution ==
This marine species occurs off Venezuela at depths between 0 m and 16 m.
