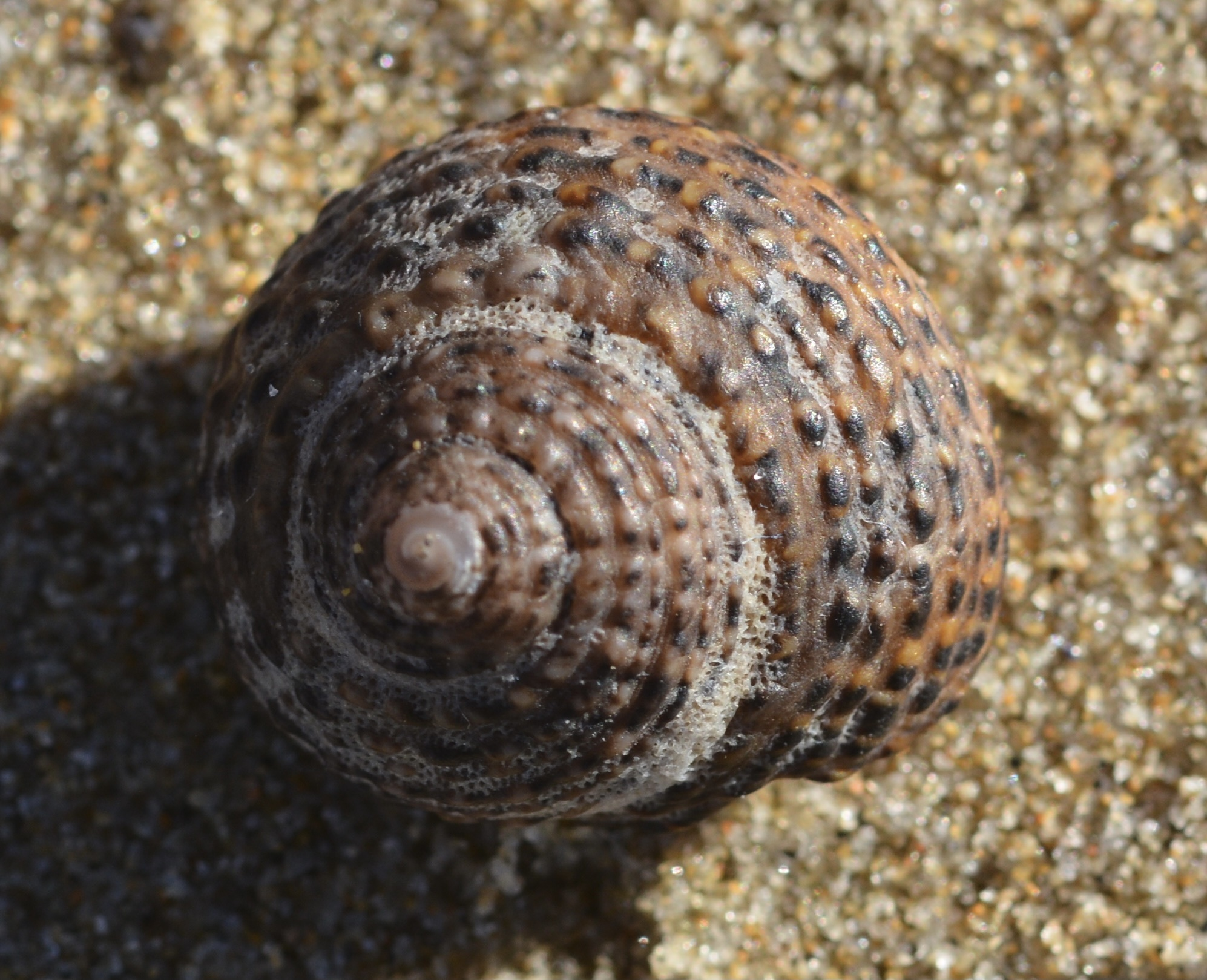

Scientific classification
- Kingdom: Animalia
- Phylum: Mollusca
- Class: Gastropoda
- Subclass: Vetigastropoda
- Order: Trochida
- Family: Tegulidae
- Genus: Tegula
- Species: T. eiseni

Binomial name
- Tegula eiseni (Jordan, 1936)

Synonyms
- Tegula (Agathistoma) mendella McLean, J.H., 1964

= Tegula eiseni =

Species of gastropod

Tegula eiseni, common name the western banded tegula, is a species of sea snail, a marine gastropod mollusk in the family Tegulidae.

== Description ==
The shell is conical in shape and its size varies between 13 mm and 22 mm, being covered in 12-13 spiral ribs which are coarse and nodded when above the widest part of the whorl. The snail also possesses a corneal operculum which serves to close off the rounded opening of the shell. On the underside of the shell there is a deep umbilicus present.

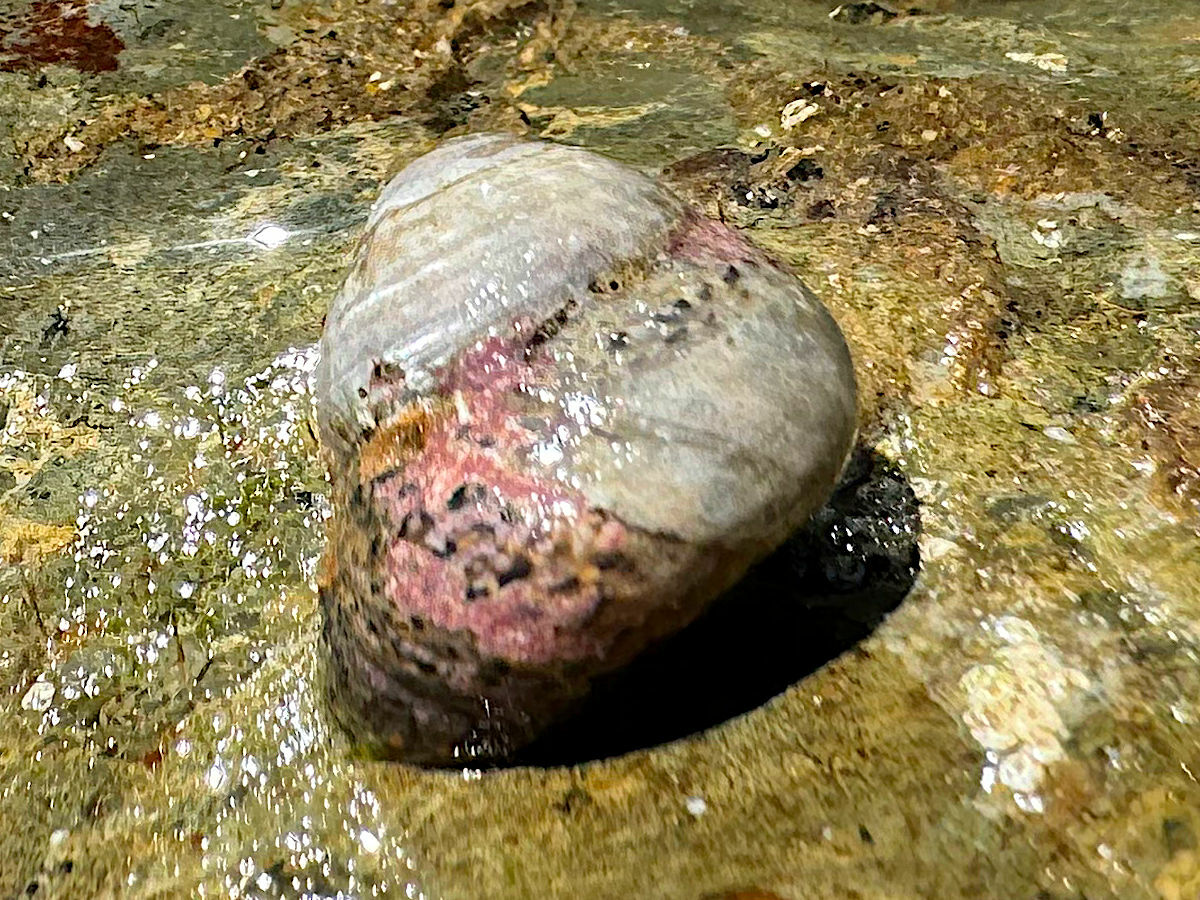
upperside, Point Loma, San Diego

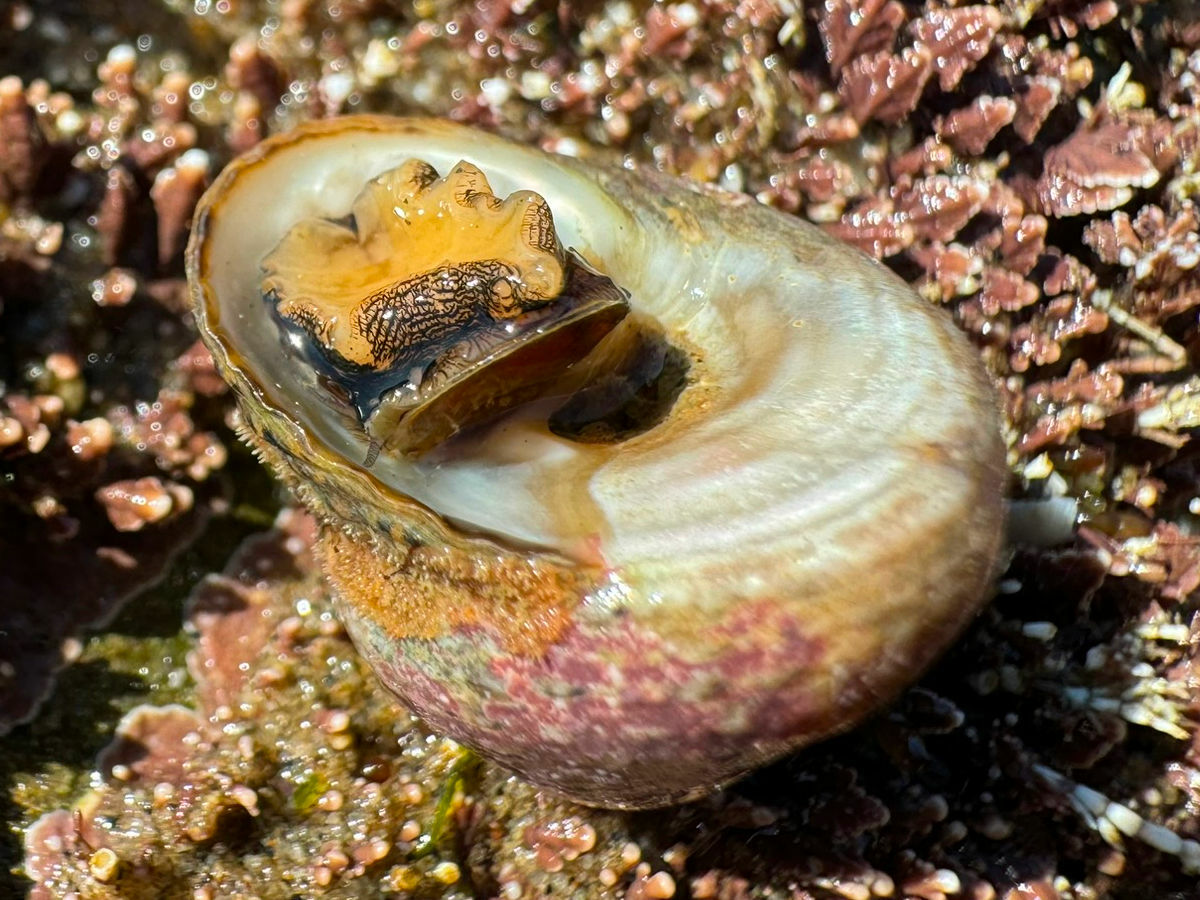
underside, umbilicus and operculum visible Point Loma, San Diego

== Distribution ==
This species occurs in the Pacific Ocean from central California, USA to Baja California, Mexico. Their range specifically extends from Los Angeles, California, to Magdalena Bay in Baja California Sur.

== Ecology ==
Tegula eiseni inhabits the intertidal zone from the shore up to 18 meters in depth, grazing on algae growing on the rocky surface of the substrate. Common predators of eiseni include octopus, sea stars, and the Kellet's whelk, though they are often not the preferred food source. Unlike other closely related tegula snails, such as Tegula aureotincta, which defend themselves against predators through locomotion, eiseni have developed thicker shells to dissuade predators. Despite these defenses, eiseni are most common in habitats with lower predator densities.

== Reproduction ==
Reproduction in this species takes place in two yearly spawning events, one in the spring and one in the fall, where individuals primarily partake in partial spawning though total spawning has been observed. eiseni are dioecious, with the reproductive organs of females being green (moss) colored whereas in males they take on a cream color. Females undergo oogenesis between january and april before experiencing gonadal maturation in late summer and fall. After spawning occurs, it takes young eiseni 2 days to enter the veliger stage of development, and then another 2 days after that to fully settle. The teleoconch in juveniles begins development 12 days after initial fertilization, with the juveniles becoming morphologically identical after roughly 60 days of life.

== Diet ==
eiseni acts as an important herbivore in the intertidal community, feeding on both macro algae such as Rhizoclonium and diatoms. When feeding, eiseni move slowly over the reef, eating algae down to the surface of the rock before finding another patch. This is opposed to other tegula species which inhabit the same geographic area, whose feeding behavior involves moving faster between feeding locations while only lightly grazing the algae present. Such differences in foraging behaviors allow for multiple species of tegula to coexist in the same area while also feeding on the same types of algae. Despite primarily feeding through herbivory, eiseni have also been known to consume tissue of foraminifera and invertebrate larvae.

== Relationship with humans ==
Despite living alongside other mollusks which have dedicated fisheries such as abalone and the wavy turban snail, eiseni have little commercial value. However, eiseni have been used in the aquarium trade for the sake of cleaning tanks from unwanted algae.
