= Tegula gruneri =

- Drawing of a shell of Tegula gruneri

Scientific classification
- Kingdom: Animalia
- Phylum: Mollusca
- Class: Gastropoda
- Subclass: Vetigastropoda
- Order: Trochida
- Family: Tegulidae
- Genus: Tegula
- Species: T. gruneri

Binomial name
- Tegula gruneri (Philippi, 1849)

Synonyms
- Chlorostoma substriatum Pilsbry, 1889; Trochus (Phorcus) gruneri Philippi, 1849 (original description)

Species of gastropod

Tegula gruneri is a species of sea snail, a marine gastropod mollusk in the family Tegulidae.

== Description ==
The height of the shell attains 6 mm, its diameter 10 mm. The shell is much more depressed than Tegula fasciata and has a discoidal shape. It is widely umbilicate. The surface is sculptured by numerous spiral slightly elevated lirulae, which are red, more or less articulated with white dots. The periphery shows frequently two or several more prominent lirae.

== Distribution ==
This species occurs in the Caribbean Sea, the Gulf of Mexico and off the Lesser Antilles in the subtidal zone.
