= Tegula felipensis =

Scientific classification
- Kingdom: Animalia
- Phylum: Mollusca
- Class: Gastropoda
- Subclass: Vetigastropoda
- Order: Trochida
- Family: Tegulidae
- Genus: Tegula
- Species: T. felipensis

Binomial name
- Tegula felipensis McLean, 1970

Synonyms
- Tegula (Agathistoma) felipensis McLean, 1870

Species of gastropod

Tegula felipensis is a species of sea snail, a marine gastropod mollusk in the family Tegulidae.

== Description ==
The size of the shell varies between 14 mm and 17 mm.

== Distribution ==
This marine species occurs off Baja California, Mexico.
