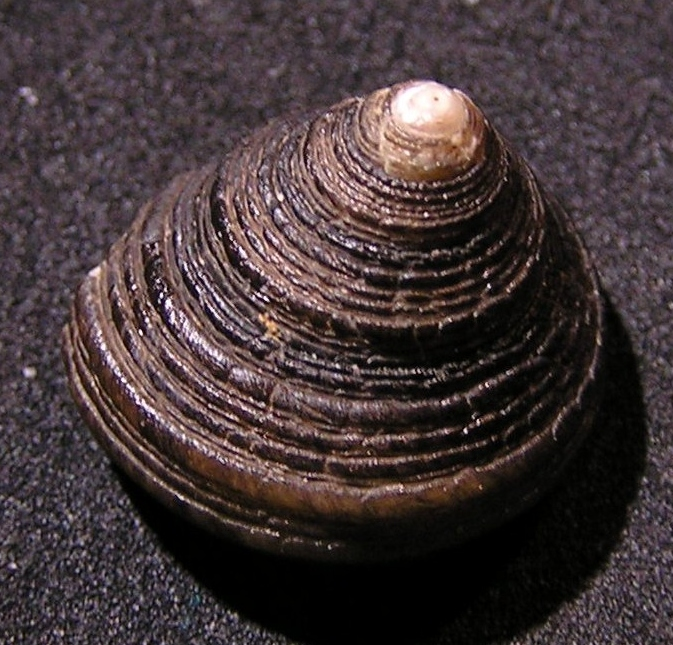
- Tegula ignota

Scientific classification
- Kingdom: Animalia
- Phylum: Mollusca
- Class: Gastropoda
- Subclass: Vetigastropoda
- Order: Trochida
- Family: Tegulidae
- Genus: Tegula
- Species: T. ignota

Binomial name
- Tegula ignota Ramírez-Böhme, 1976

= Tegula ignota =

Species of gastropod

Tegula ignota is a species of sea snail, a marine gastropod mollusk in the family Tegulidae.

== Description ==
The size of the shell attains 35 mm.

== Distribution ==
This species occurs in the Pacific Ocean off Chile.
