= Tegula verrucosa =

Scientific classification
- Kingdom: Animalia
- Phylum: Mollusca
- Class: Gastropoda
- Subclass: Vetigastropoda
- Order: Trochida
- Family: Tegulidae
- Genus: Tegula
- Species: T. verrucosa

Binomial name
- Tegula verrucosa McLean, 1970

Synonyms
- Tegula (Agathistoma) verrucosa McLean, 1970

Species of gastropod

Tegula verrucosa is a species of sea snail, a marine gastropod mollusk in the family Tegulidae.

== Description ==
The size of the shells varies between 15 mm and 20 mm.

== Distribution ==
This species occurs in the Pacific Ocean from El Salvador to Peru.
