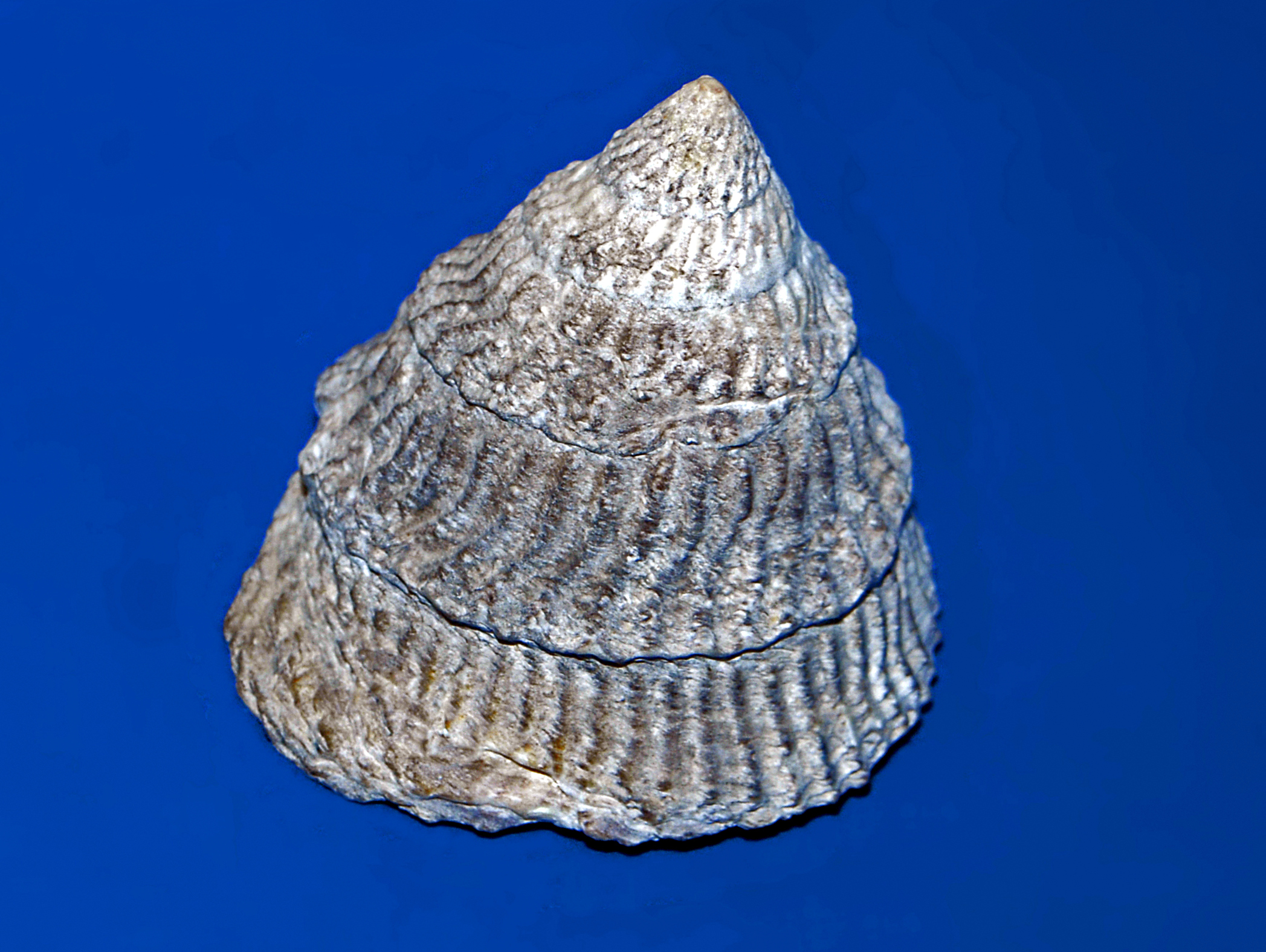
- A shell of Tegula regina
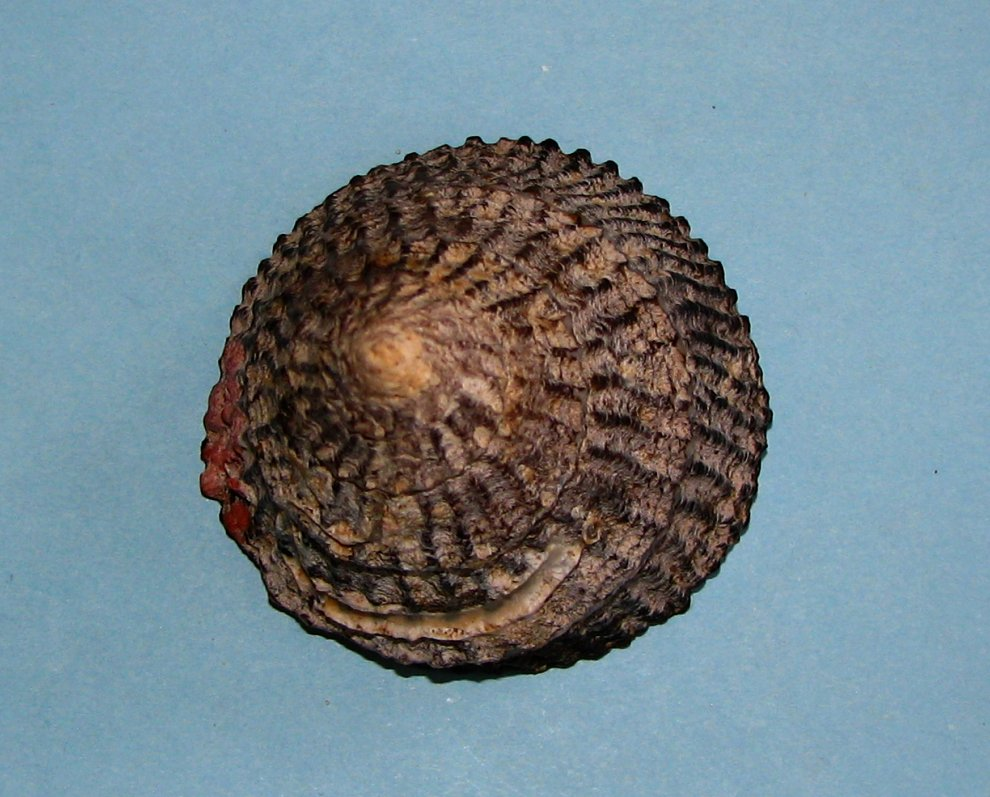
- Top view

Scientific classification
- Kingdom: Animalia
- Phylum: Mollusca
- Class: Gastropoda
- Subclass: Vetigastropoda
- Order: Trochida
- Family: Tegulidae
- Genus: Tegula
- Species: T. regina

Binomial name
- Tegula regina (Stearns, 1892)

Synonyms
- Uvalina regina Stearns, 1892

= Tegula regina =

Species of gastropod

Tegula regina, common name the "queen tegula", is a species of large sea snail, a marine gastropod mollusk in the family Tegulidae.

== Description ==
The size of the shell varies between 38 mm and 64 mm. The imperforate shell has a conical shape. It is black or purplish-black. The 6 to 7 whorls are concave, longitudinally somewhat obliquely plicated. The plicae more or less project at the suture and on the edge of the basal whorl, producing an undulating or crenulated effect. Otherwise sculptured by incremental striae which traverse the surface and cross the plicae at right angles. The base of the shell is concave, radiately, closely and prominently striated, more conspicuous flattened, coalescing and sinuously curving at the edge. Commencing at the point where the outer lip joins the body whorl, a shallow groove follows parallel to the periphery and extends toward the aperture without interrupting the basal sculpture. The oblique aperture is subangulate, black-rimmed and crenulated on the thin edge of the outer lip. It is nacreous, silvery white toward the edge, bright lustrous golden yellow within and around the umbilical region, which latter though deeply pitted is not open. The white columella has a callus and is arcuated with a moderately developed rib bounding the umbilical depression and terminating in a single tubercle. This rib is paralleled by a shallow furrow terminating in a notch just below the tubercle, and by an exterior or outer ridge, part of the way double, of a brilliant orange color. This orange-colored rib is also exteriorly bounded by a shallow furrow that becomes obsolete toward the aperture. The base of the shell otherwise exhibits faint revolving sculpture.

This species was described by the author as Uvalina regina. W.H. Dall recognized this species as Tegula regina because the operculum is horny and moderately multispiral, instead of possessing a heavy calcareous operculum as in true Uvalinas.

== Distribution ==
This species occurs in the Pacific Ocean from Southern California, USA to the Gulf of California, W Mexico
