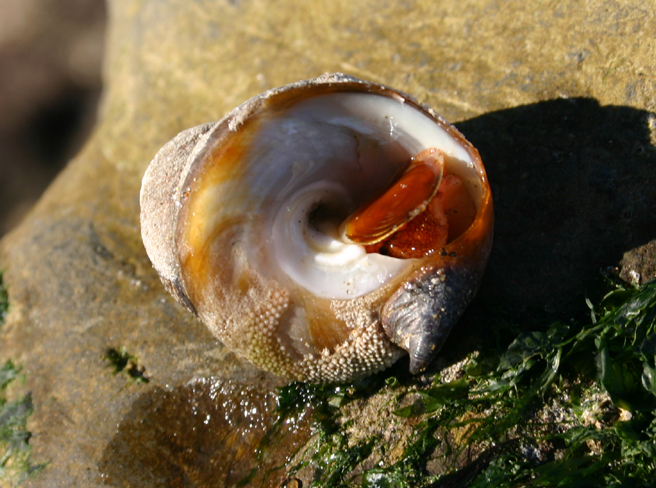
- A live but partially retracted individual of Tegula montereyi

Scientific classification
- Kingdom: Animalia
- Phylum: Mollusca
- Class: Gastropoda
- Subclass: Vetigastropoda
- Order: Trochida
- Family: Tegulidae
- Genus: Tegula
- Species: T. montereyi

Binomial name
- Tegula montereyi (Kiener, 1850)

Synonyms
- Chlorostoma montereyi (Kiener, 1850); Trochus montereyi Kiener, 1850 (original description)

= Tegula montereyi =

Species of gastropod

Tegula montereyi, common name the "Monterey tegula", is a species of sea snail, a marine gastropod mollusk in the family Tegulidae.

This is an Eastern Pacific Ocean species which was previously known as Chlorostoma montereyi. The specific epithet refers to Monterey, California.

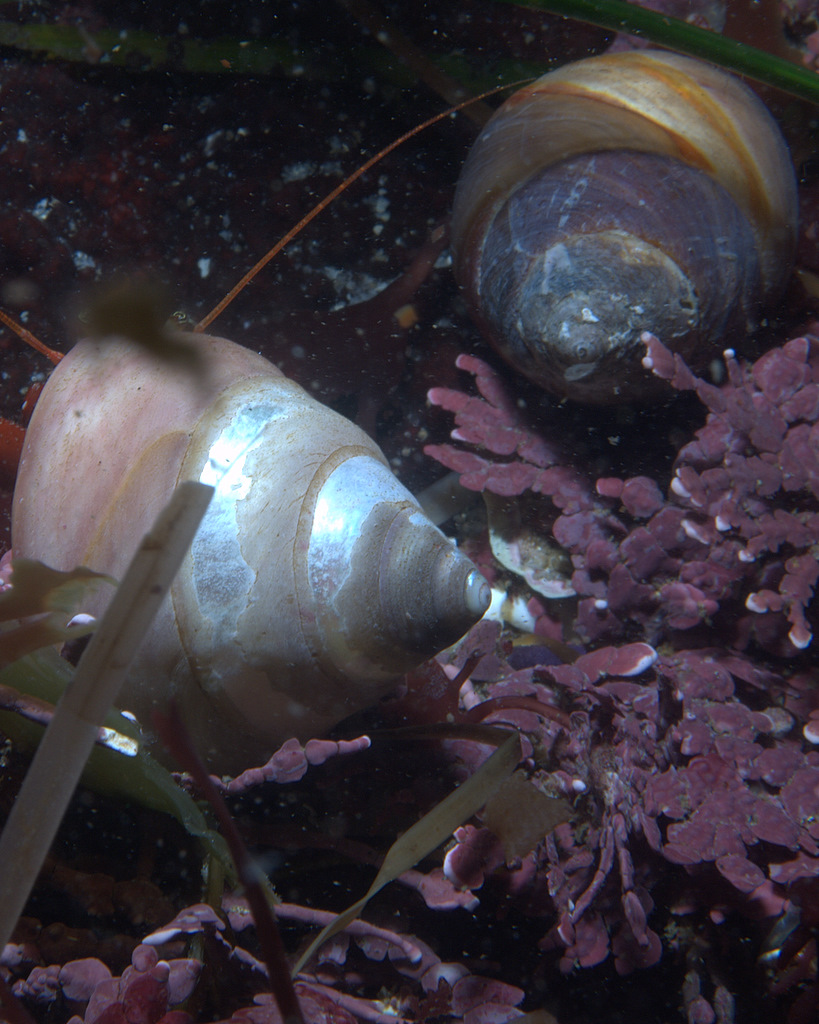
Live Tegula montereyi

== Description ==
The height of the shell varies between 28–39 mm, its diameter between 34–42 mm. The rather thin, umbilicate shell has a strictly conical shape. It is light olivaceous or pale corneous. The spire is conical, with nearly straight outlines. The apex is acute. The sutures are linear. The seven whorls are flattened, encircled by numerous fine lirae, which become obsolete on the lower whorl, which shows usually very ill-defined obliquely descending small folds, at right angles to the incremental striae. The body whorl is acutely angular at the periphery. The base of the shell is flat, spirally, subobsoletely lirate. The aperture subhorizontal. The outer lip is thin, margined with brown or corneous. The columella is subhorizontal, curved, toothed below the middle, receding above, not spreading around the umbilicus as in some other species of this genus. The umbilicus is funnel-shaped, rapidly becoming very narrow, white within, its edge defined by an angle.

== Distribution ==
This species occurs in the Pacific Ocean off the coast of California, USA.
