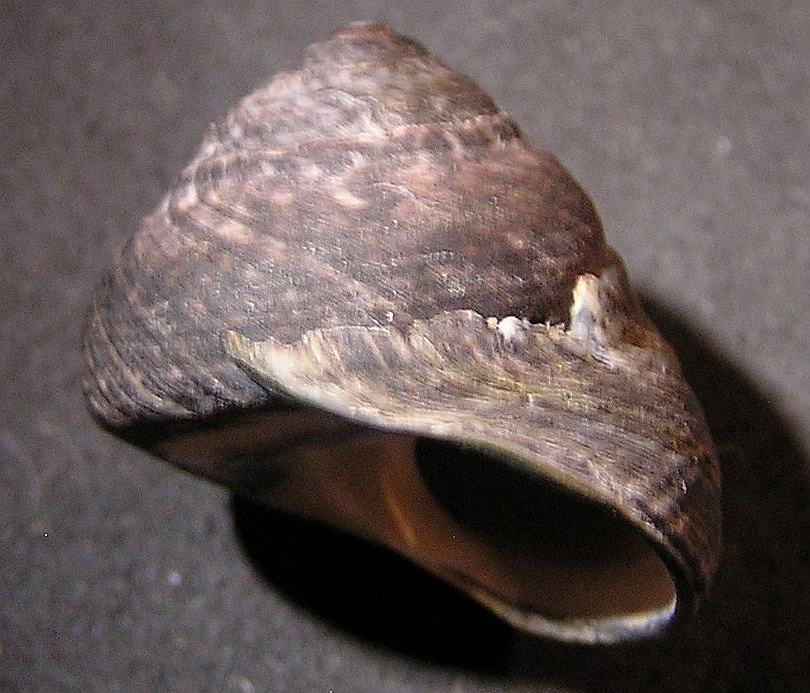
- View of a shell of Tegula gallina

Scientific classification
- Kingdom: Animalia
- Phylum: Mollusca
- Class: Gastropoda
- Subclass: Vetigastropoda
- Order: Trochida
- Family: Tegulidae
- Genus: Tegula
- Species: T. gallina

Binomial name
- Tegula gallina (Forbes, 1850)

Synonyms
- Chlorostoma gallina (Forbes, 1850); Trochus (Monodonta) gallina Forbes, 1850 (original description); Trochus gallina Fischer; Trochus pyriformis Gould, 1853

= Tegula gallina =

Species of gastropod

Tegula gallina (or commonly, Speckled Tegula) is a North American species of sea snail, a marine gastropod mollusk in the family Tegulidae.

== Description ==
The shell of T. gallina is typically 3/4 to 1 5/8 in (1.9 to 4.1 cm) high and wide, though it may be slightly higher than wide.

The imperforate, heavy, solid, thick shell has a conoidal shape and is elevated. Its colors show alternating whitish and purplish-grey or blackish crowded, slanting axial stripes, speckled with whitish. The stripes occupy the interstices between close, narrow superficial folds of the surface, which may be well-marked, or obsolete, continuous or cut into granules by equally close spiral furrows, the latter sometimes predominating.

Its 5 to 6 whorls are convex and rough, and usually indented a short distance below the suture. The spire is conoidal. The apex is usually blunt, eroded and yellow. The body whorl is rounded at the periphery. The convex base often has an eroded area in front of the aperture, above a closed umbilicus, the area around which is usually white. The oblique aperture is nearly round. The outer lip is black-edged, smooth and pearly within. The columella is short, arcuate, and strongly bidentate near the base. The place of the umbilicus is marked by a pit

The above description applies to the typical form. The sculpture of the surface is superficial and very variable, as is the distribution of the color markings, which is dependent upon the sculpture. It is sometimes difficult to separate this from Tegula funebralis.

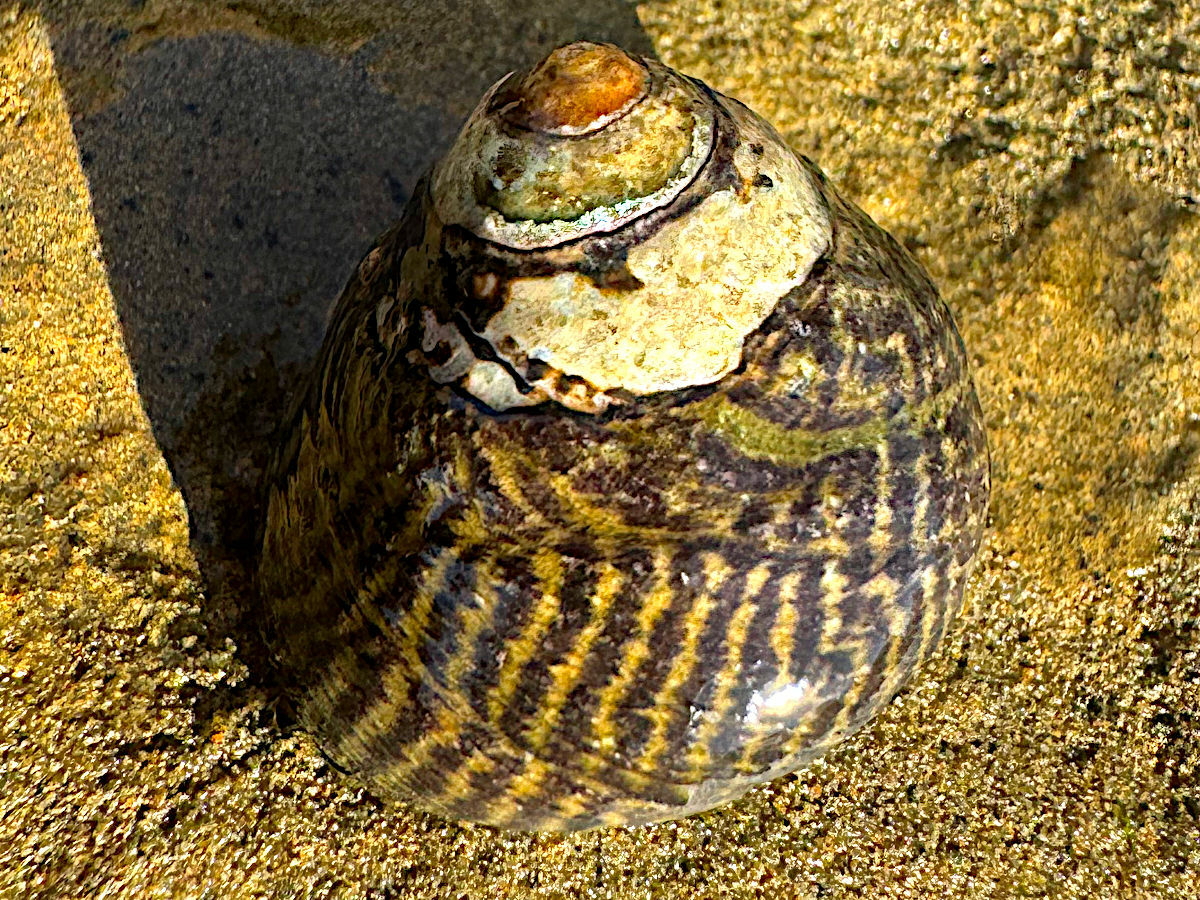
upperside, Point Loma, San Diego

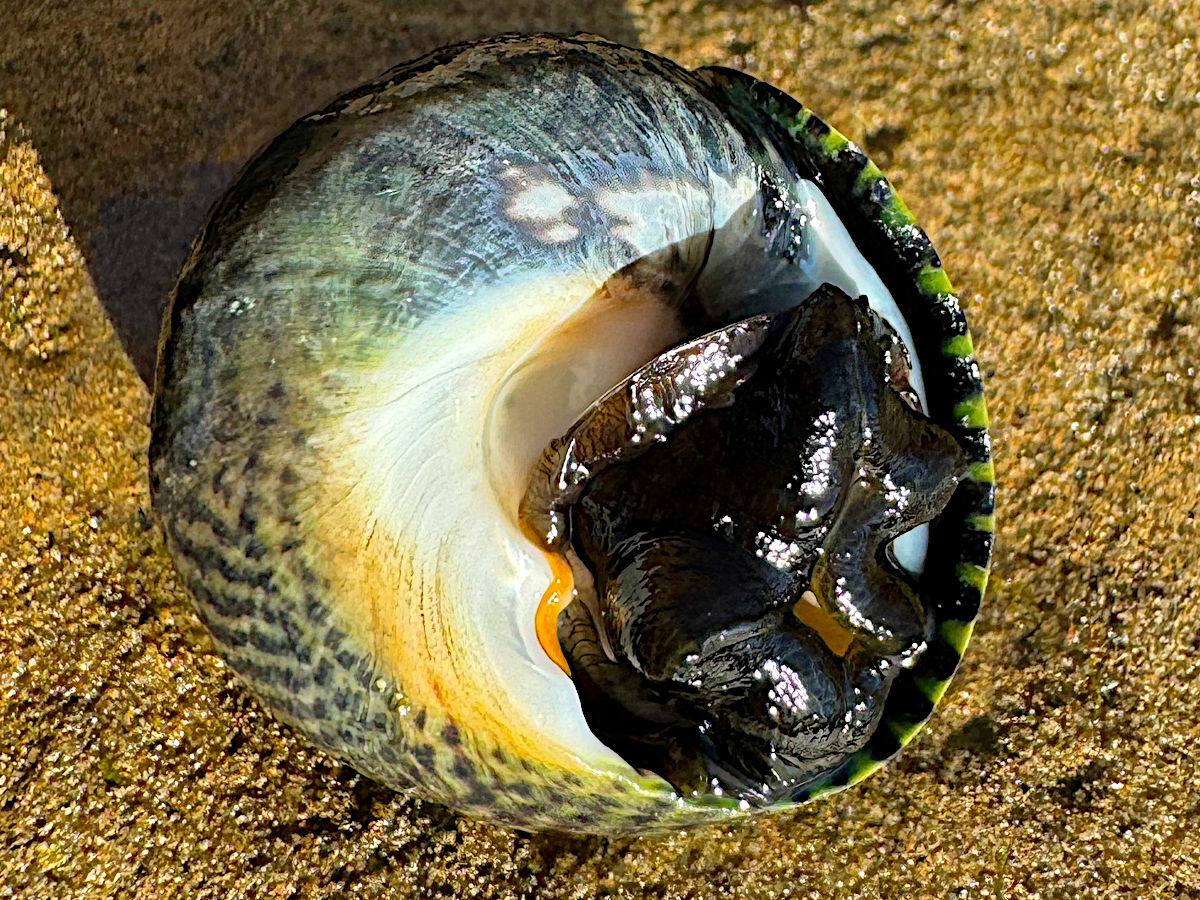
underside, Point Loma, San Diego

== Distribution ==
T. gallina lives on intertidal rocks. Its range extends from Santa Barbara County, California to Baja California (Pacific Ocean). Larger specimens of the species live in the southern portion of its range; it is often found alongside the less-common Black Tegula (T. funebralis).
