= Carolesia =

Scientific classification
- Kingdom: Animalia
- Phylum: Mollusca
- Class: Gastropoda
- Subclass: Vetigastropoda
- Order: Trochida
- Superfamily: Trochoidea
- Family: Tegulidae
- Genus: Carolesia; Güller & Zelaya, 2014

Genus of small to medium-sized sea snails

Carolesia is a genus of small to medium-sized sea snails, marine gastropod molluscs in the family Tegulidae.

== Species ==
- Carolesia blakei (Clench & Aguayo, 1938)
