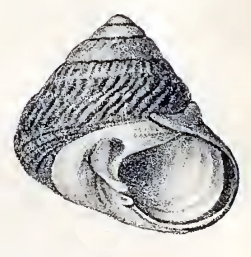
- Drawing with an apertural view of a shell of Tegula rugosa

Scientific classification
- Kingdom: Animalia
- Phylum: Mollusca
- Class: Gastropoda
- Subclass: Vetigastropoda
- Order: Trochida
- Family: Tegulidae
- Genus: Tegula
- Species: T. rugosa

Binomial name
- Tegula rugosa (A. Adams, 1853)

Synonyms
- Chlorostoma rugosum A. Adams, 1851 (original combination)

= Tegula rugosa =

Species of gastropod

Tegula rugosa, common name the rough top shell, is a species of sea snail, a marine gastropod mollusk in the family Tegulidae.

== Distribution ==
This marine species occurs off Lower California and the Gulf of California.

== Description ==
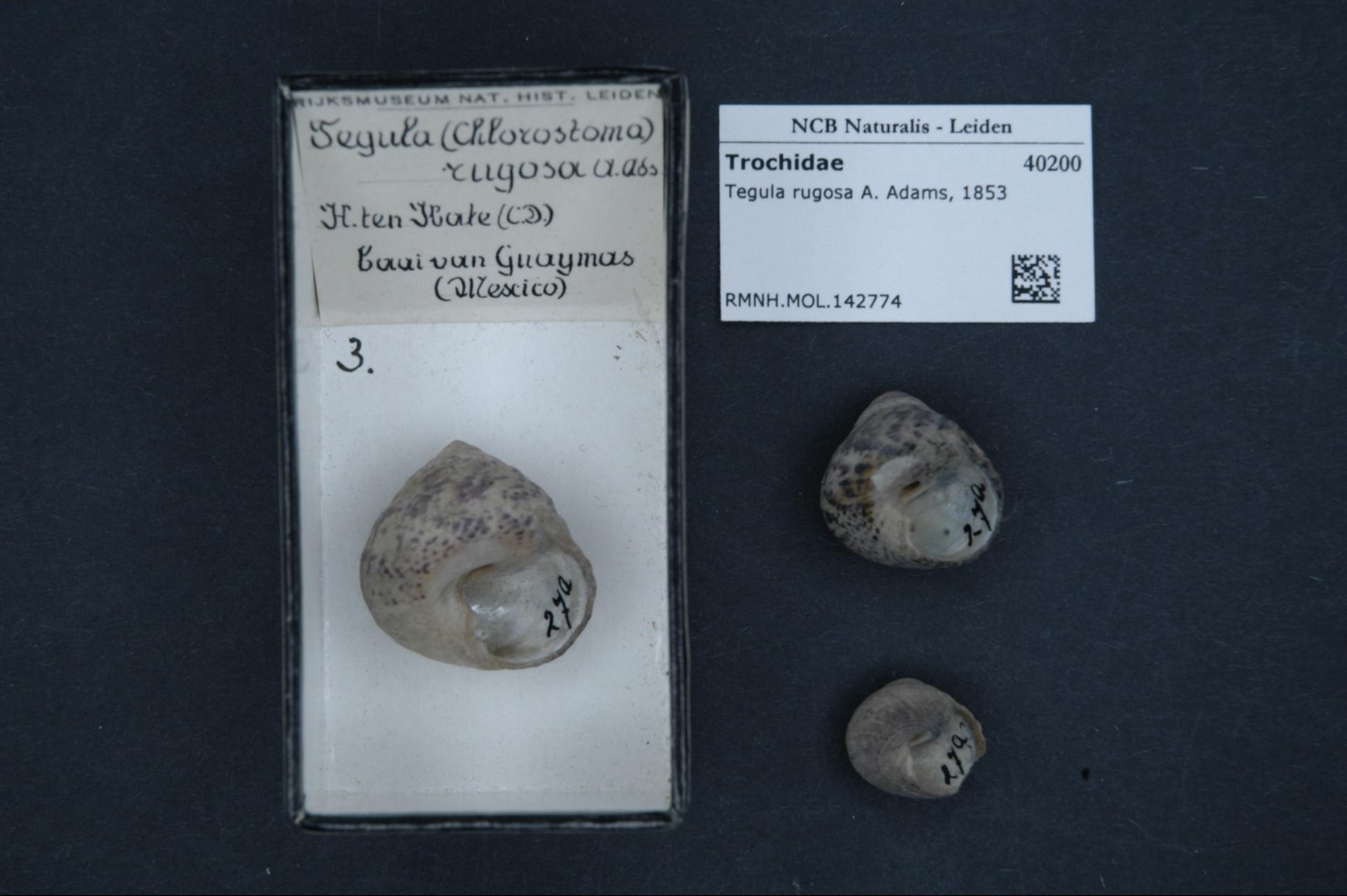
Tegula rugosa shells.

The height of the shell attains 26 mm, its diameter 27 mm. Some are larger with a height of 50 mm. The solid, heavy shell is narrowly umbilicate and has a conoidal shape. It is dull cinereous, more or less variegated by brown, blackish or red streaks. The spire is conoidal, generally eroded and white or yellow at the apex. The about 5 whorls are obliquely striate, radiately coarsely and irregularly plicate and rugose above, sometimes nearly smooth. The periphery is rounded. The base of the shell is convex and concentrically lirate. The aperture is oblique. The columella is strongly dentate in the middle or below it, with a second small tooth at the base. The edge of the columella is rather deeply curved above the tooth, but spreading at its junction with the whorl, bounding and somewhat narrowing the umbilicus by a white callus, which does not extend to the upper margin of the aperture. The deep umbilicus is white within.
