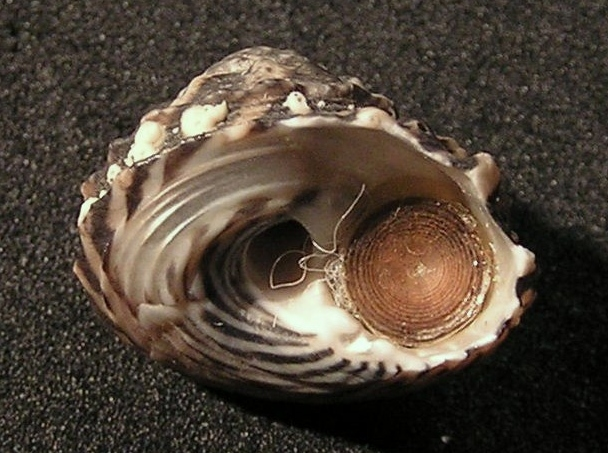
- View of a shell of Tegula melaleucos

Scientific classification
- Kingdom: Animalia
- Phylum: Mollusca
- Class: Gastropoda
- Subclass: Vetigastropoda
- Order: Trochida
- Family: Tegulidae
- Genus: Tegula
- Species: T. melaleucos

Binomial name
- Tegula melaleucos (Jonas, 1844)

Synonyms
- Chlorostoma melaleucos (Jonas, 1844); Tegula (Agathistoma) melaleucus (Jonas, 1844); Trochus melaleucos Jonas, 1844 (original description)

= Tegula melaleucos =

Species of gastropod

Tegula melaleucos is a species of sea snail, a marine gastropod mollusk in the family Tegulidae.

== Description ==
The size of the shell varies between 16 mm and 31 mm. The rather solid shell has a conical shape. The apex is obtuse. The shell is profoundly umbilicated. Its color is white, ornamented with oblique black flammules. The six whorls show a coronal series of tubercles. They are carinated with a nodulose carina. They are channelled below the carina, and spirally bistriate. The body whorl is bicarinate. The base of the shell is concentrically sulcate. The aperture is subrhomboid, with its upper part smooth. The columella is arcuate; terminating in two teeth.

Characteristics of this species are: the whorls are divided by a nodose keel into a larger convex upper portion and a smaller channelled lower part. A second series of blunt tubercles adorns the upper edge of the whorls along the suture. Below there are slightly elevated striae. The body whorl has the base sharply separated by a second keel. The base is concentrically, rather deeply furrowed, the 6 furrows narrower than the intervening ridges. In the umbilicus, which perforates almost to the apex, all of the whorls are visible, encircled by an acute carina. The aperture is subquadrate, nacreous, smooth within, and has a groove indicating the place of the external keel. The columella is S-shaped, and ends in a blunt tooth, before which there is a small acute denticle. Above, the columellar plate is callous, and covers a small portion of the umbilicus. The pretty markings of the shell consist of oblique, regular wide black streaks, separated by spaces as broad as themselves, on a white ground.

== Distribution ==
This species occurs in the Pacific Ocean between Ecuador and Northern Peru.
