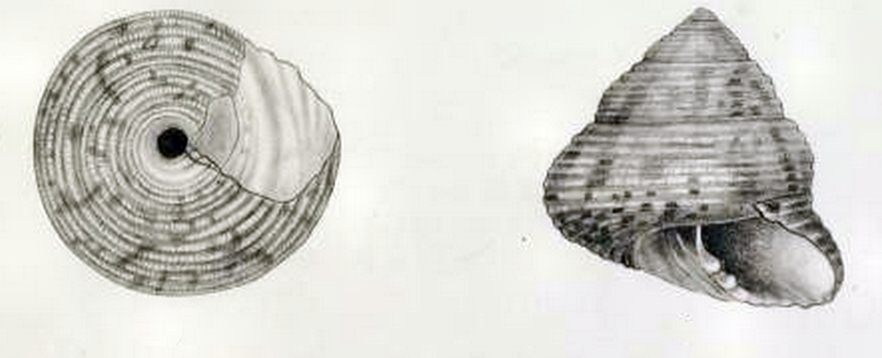
- Original drawing with two views of a shell of Tegula snodgrassi

Scientific classification
- Kingdom: Animalia
- Phylum: Mollusca
- Class: Gastropoda
- Subclass: Vetigastropoda
- Order: Trochida
- Family: Tegulidae
- Genus: Tegula
- Species: T. snodgrassi

Binomial name
- Tegula snodgrassi (Pilsbry & Vanatta, 1902)

Synonyms
- Chlorostoma barkeri Bartsch, P. & H.A. Rehder, 1939; Chlorostoma snodgrassi Pilsbry, H.A. & E.G. Vanatta, 1902

= Tegula snodgrassi =

Species of gastropod

Tegula snodgrassi is a species of sea snail, a marine gastropod mollusk in the family Tegulidae.

== Distribution ==
This marine species was found in the Pacific Ocean off the Albemarle Island, Galapagos Islands.
