= Tegula globulus =

Scientific classification
- Kingdom: Animalia
- Phylum: Mollusca
- Class: Gastropoda
- Subclass: Vetigastropoda
- Order: Trochida
- Family: Tegulidae
- Genus: Tegula
- Species: T. globulus

Binomial name
- Tegula globulus (Carpenter, 1857)

Synonyms
- Omphalius globulus Carpenter, 1857; Tegula (Agathistoma) globulus (Carpenter, 1857)

Species of gastropod

Tegula globulus is a species of sea snail, a marine gastropod mollusk in the family Tegulidae.

== Description ==
The size of its shell is 11 mm.

== Distribution ==
This marine species is common under or on rocks at high-tide level off Southern California, United States; and Baja California, Mexico.
