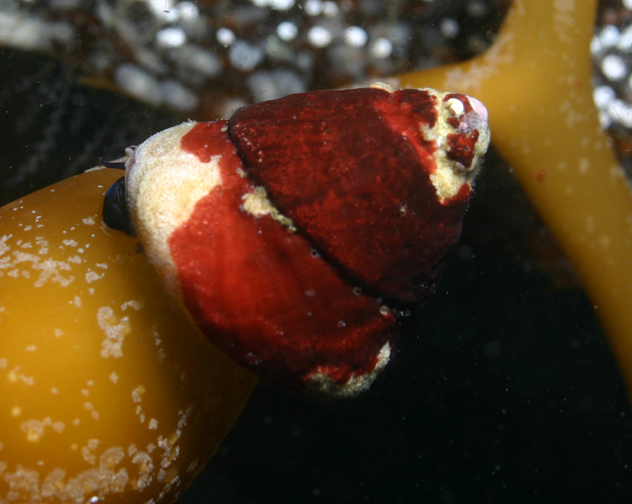
- A live individual of Tegula brunnea

Scientific classification
- Kingdom: Animalia
- Phylum: Mollusca
- Class: Gastropoda
- Subclass: Vetigastropoda
- Order: Trochida
- Family: Tegulidae
- Genus: Tegula
- Species: T. brunnea

Binomial name
- Tegula brunnea (Philippi, 1848)

Synonyms
- Chlorostoma brunnea (Philippi, 1848); Chlorostoma brunneum (Philippi, 1848); Trochus brunneus Philippi, 1849 (original combination)

= Tegula brunnea =

Species of gastropod

Tegula brunnea, common name the brown turban snail, is a species of medium-sized sea snail, a marine gastropod mollusk in the family Tegulidae.

This is an Eastern Pacific Ocean species which was previously known as Chlorostoma brunnea.

== Description ==
The size of the shell varies between 19 mm and 45 mm. The solid, imperforate shell has a conical shape. It is russet-yellow, brown, orange-colored or deep crimson. The spire is conic. The sutures are deeply impressed. The about seven whorls are convex, smooth, and obliquely lightly striate. The body whorl sometimes is obsoletely undulated or plicate below the suture. The base of the shell is depressed and deeply concave in the center. The aperture is very oblique. The columella has one or two teeth near the base. The umbilical callus is white. The place of the umbilicus is deeply excavated. The relative altitude and the size are extremely variable.

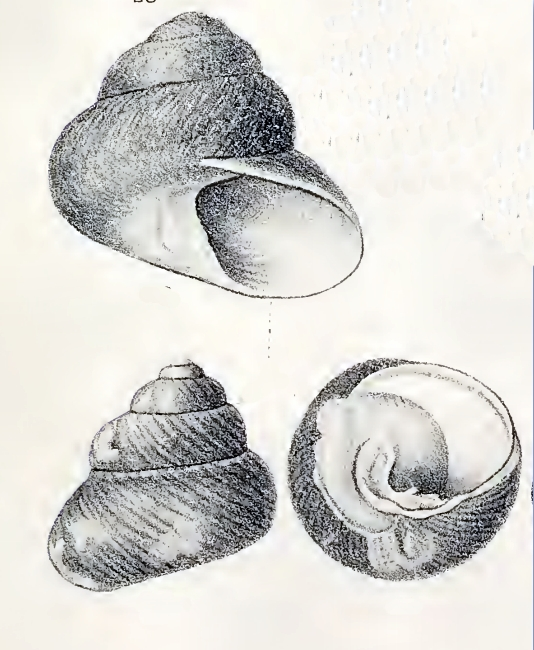
Drawing with three views of a shell of Tegula brunnea

== Distribution ==
This species occurs in the Pacific Ocean off Oregon to Santa Barbara Islands, California, USA
