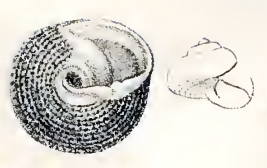
- Drawing with two views of a shell of Tegula patagonica

Scientific classification
- Kingdom: Animalia
- Phylum: Mollusca
- Class: Gastropoda
- Subclass: Vetigastropoda
- Order: Trochida
- Family: Tegulidae
- Genus: Tegula
- Species: T. patagonica

Binomial name
- Tegula patagonica (d'Orbigny, 1838)

Synonyms
- Clanculus patagonicus d'Orbigny, 1835; Chlorostoma corrugata Koch, 1843; Chlorostoma hidalgoi Pilsbry, 1900; Chlorostoma orbignyanum Pilsbry, 1900; Chlorostoma patagonicus d'Orbigny, 1835; Minolia amblia Dall, 1927; Monodonta patagonica d'Orbigny, 1835; Neomphalius patagonica d'Orbigny, 1835; Neomphalius princeps Ihering, 1907; Trochus corrugatus Koch, 1843; Trochus fuscescens Philippi, 1845; Trochus patagonicus d'Orbigny, 1835 (original description)

= Tegula patagonica =

Species of gastropod

Tegula patagonica is a species of sea snail, a marine gastropod mollusk in the family Tegulidae.

== Description ==
The size of the shell varies between 10 mm and 21 mm. The thick, umbilicate shell has an orbiculate-conical shape. It is transversely narrowly granulose-sulcate. It has a uniform brownish or purplish color. The spire is conic. The apex is obtuse. The five whorls are subcarinate with sutures excavated. The aperture is rounded. The columella is bidentate.

== Distribution ==
This marine species occurs from Southern Brazil to Southern Chile at depths between 0 m and 57 m.
