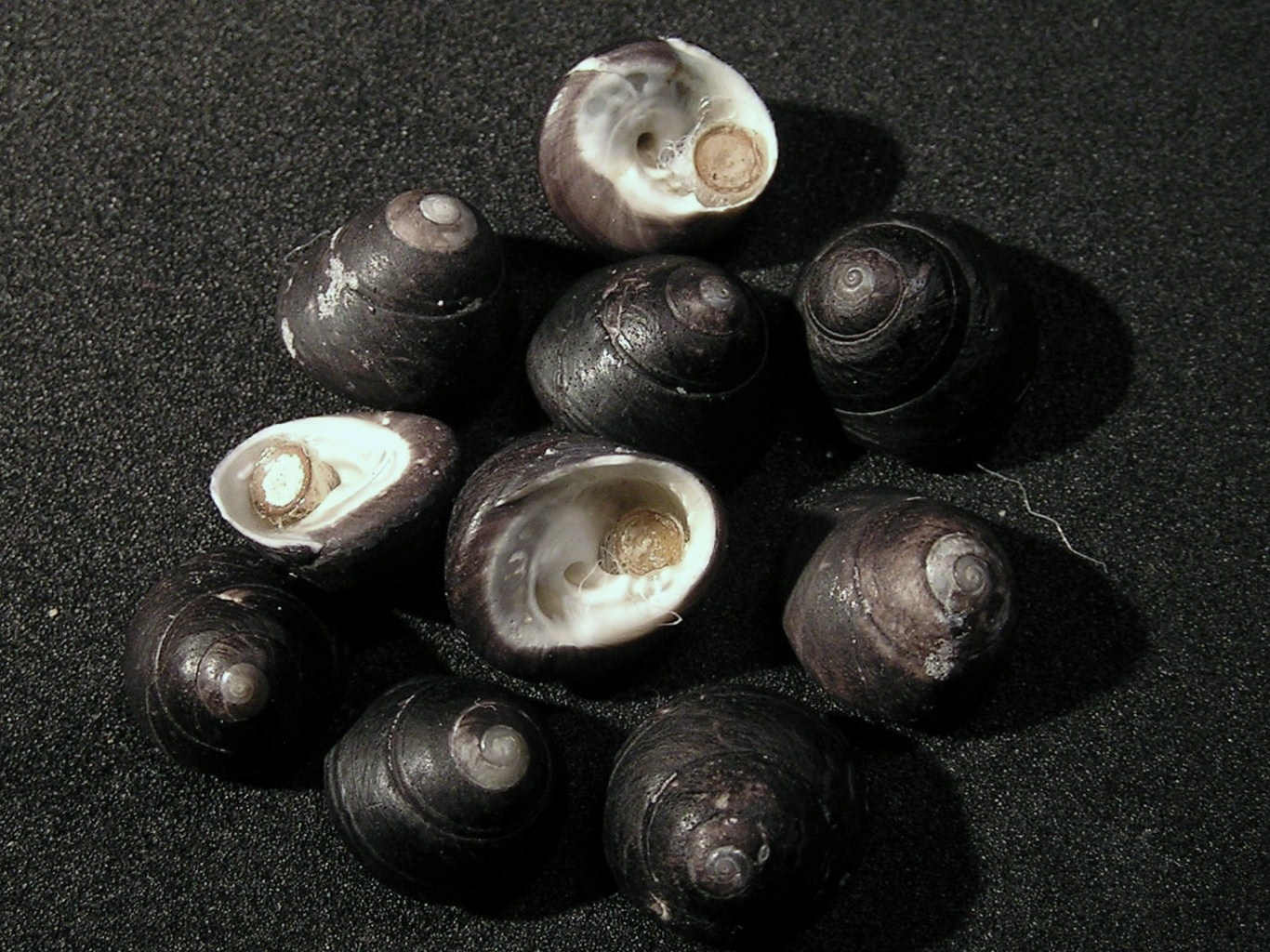
- Ten shells of Tegula tridentata

Scientific classification
- Kingdom: Animalia
- Phylum: Mollusca
- Class: Gastropoda
- Subclass: Vetigastropoda
- Order: Trochida
- Family: Tegulidae
- Genus: Tegula
- Species: T. tridentata

Binomial name
- Tegula tridentata (Potiez & Michaud, 1838)

Synonyms
- Chlorostoma tridentata (Potiez & Michaud, 1838); Monodonta tridentata Potiez & Michaud, 1838 (original combination); Trochus microstomus d'Orbigny, 1841; Trochus stenomphalus Jonas, 1844; Trochus tridens Mke. in Philippi; Trochus tridentatus Philippi

= Tegula tridentata =

Species of sea snail

Tegula tridentata is a species of sea snail, a marine gastropod mollusk in the family Tegulidae.

== Taxonomy ==
Tegula tridentata is considered an invalid name according to WoRMS. The valid name is Agathistoma tridentatum.

== Description ==
The height of the shell varies between 19 mm and 22 mm, its diameter between 15 mm and 18 mm. The heavy and solid, elevated shell is minutely perforate and has a conoidal shape. Its color is black or purplish. The 5 to 6 whorls are slightly convex. They are smooth, the last one has a rounded periphery. The base of the shell is somewhat flattened, deeply eroded in front of the aperture. The small aperture is oblique. The outer lip is thick and lirate within. The short columella is oblique and distinctly tridentate at the base. The minute umbilicus is circular.

== Distribution ==
This marine species occurs in the Pacific Ocean from Peru to Chile.
