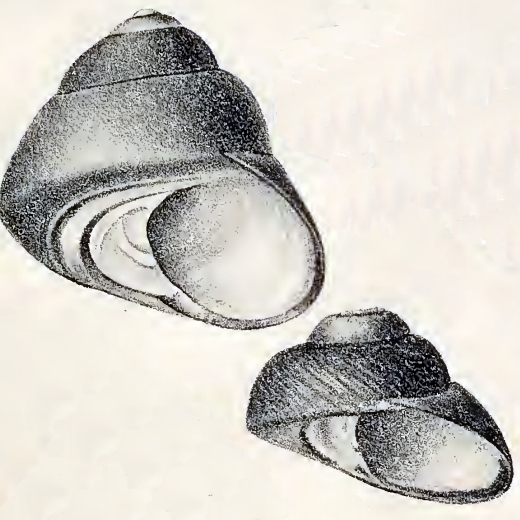
- Drawings of two shells of Tegula atra

Scientific classification
- Kingdom: Animalia
- Phylum: Mollusca
- Class: Gastropoda
- Subclass: Vetigastropoda
- Order: Trochida
- Family: Tegulidae
- Genus: Tegula
- Species: T. atra

Binomial name
- Tegula atra (Lesson, 1830)

Synonyms
- Chlorostoma atra Lesson, 1830; Tegula (Chlorostoma) atra (Lesson, 1830); Trochus ater Lesson, 1830(original description); Trochus moestus Jonas, 1844

= Tegula atra =

Species of gastropod

Tegula atra is a species of sea snail, a marine gastropod mollusk in the family Tegulidae.

== Description ==
The size of the shell varies between 24 mm and 62 mm. The heavy, solid, imperforate shell has a conical shape and is more or less depressed. It is lusterless black. The about six whorls are, moderately convex, separated by impressed sutures. They are smooth, except for slight incremental striae. The body whorl is more or less depressed, and rounded or subangular at the periphery. The base of the shell is flattened, concave in the center, eroded and light purplish in front of the aperture. The aperture is very oblique. The outer lip is black-margined, smooth and pearly within. The columella is oblique, obtusely dentate in the middle. The umbilico-columellar tract is covered by a white callus, excavated at the position of the umbilicus, and bearing a spiral rib.

== Distribution ==
This species occurs in the Pacific Ocean off the Strait of Magellan (Chile) to Peru.
