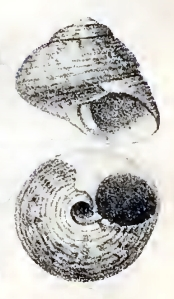
- Drawing with two views of a shell of Tegula panamensis

Scientific classification
- Kingdom: Animalia
- Phylum: Mollusca
- Class: Gastropoda
- Subclass: Vetigastropoda
- Order: Trochida
- Family: Tegulidae
- Genus: Tegula
- Species: T. panamensis

Binomial name
- Tegula panamensis (Philippi, 1849)

Synonyms
- Chlorostoma panamensis (Philippi, 1849); Tegula (Agathistoma) panamensis (Philippi, 1849); Trochus panamensis Philippi, 1849 (original description)

= Tegula panamensis =

Species of gastropod

Tegula panamensis is a species of sea snail, a marine gastropod mollusk in the family Tegulidae.

== Description ==
(Original description by Philippi) The height of the shell attains 15 mm, its diameter 19 mm. The solid shell has a globose-conoidal shape. It is umbilicate and transversely sulcate. Its color is brownish-red, almost wine-colored, marbled with white spots. The 5 to 6 whorls are separated by a deep suture. The upper ones are slightly, the penultimate, and the last strongly convex. The circumference is indistinctly angled. The whole upper surface is densely furrowed by blunt transverse sulci. The transverse sulci number about 10 on penultimate, 24 on the body whorl, including the base. The umbilicus is rather narrow, nearly cylindrical, encircled by a carina, above which a more prominent spiral rib revolves, which ends at the columella in three denticles. The very oblique aperture is circular. The columella is produced above in a lobe partly surrounding the umbilicus, below terminating in three denticles. The lip is thickened within, and this thickening where it unites with the columella, leaves a deep furrow resulting from the continuity of the margin of the outer lip with the border of the umbilicus. Above, the columella is continued in a lobe partly surrounding the umbilicus.

== Distribution ==
This species occurs in the Pacific Ocean from Nicaragua to Ecuador
