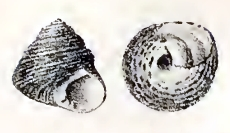
- Two views of a shell of Tegula corvus

Scientific classification
- Kingdom: Animalia
- Phylum: Mollusca
- Class: Gastropoda
- Subclass: Vetigastropoda
- Order: Trochida
- Family: Tegulidae
- Genus: Tegula
- Species: T. corvus

Binomial name
- Tegula corvus (Philippi, 1850)

Synonyms
- Chlorostoma impressum Jonas; Tegula (Agathistoma) corvus (Philippi, 1850); Trochus impressus Jonas; Trochus corvus Philippi, 1849 (original description)

= Tegula corvus =

Species of gastropod

Tegula corvus is a species of sea snail, a marine gastropod mollusk in the family Tegulidae.

== Description ==
The size of the shell attains 9 mm. The rather thick shell is narrowly and profoundly perforate and has a conoid shape. It is dull cinereous, ornamented with castaneous radiating flammules. The six whorls are rather convex and spirally finely lirate. The lirae number 7 to 8 on the penultimate whorl, 5 on the preceding. The body whorl is rounded, compressed below the suture above, somewhat convex beneath, and provided with about 10 concentric lirae. The ovate aperture is slightly dilated, the lip plicatulate within. The arcuate columella is thin in the middle, concave and bears 2 or 3 tubercles below. The green columellar callus is thick, and slightly impinging upon the umbilicus.

== Distribution ==
This species occurs in the Pacific Ocean from Mexico to Northern Peru.
