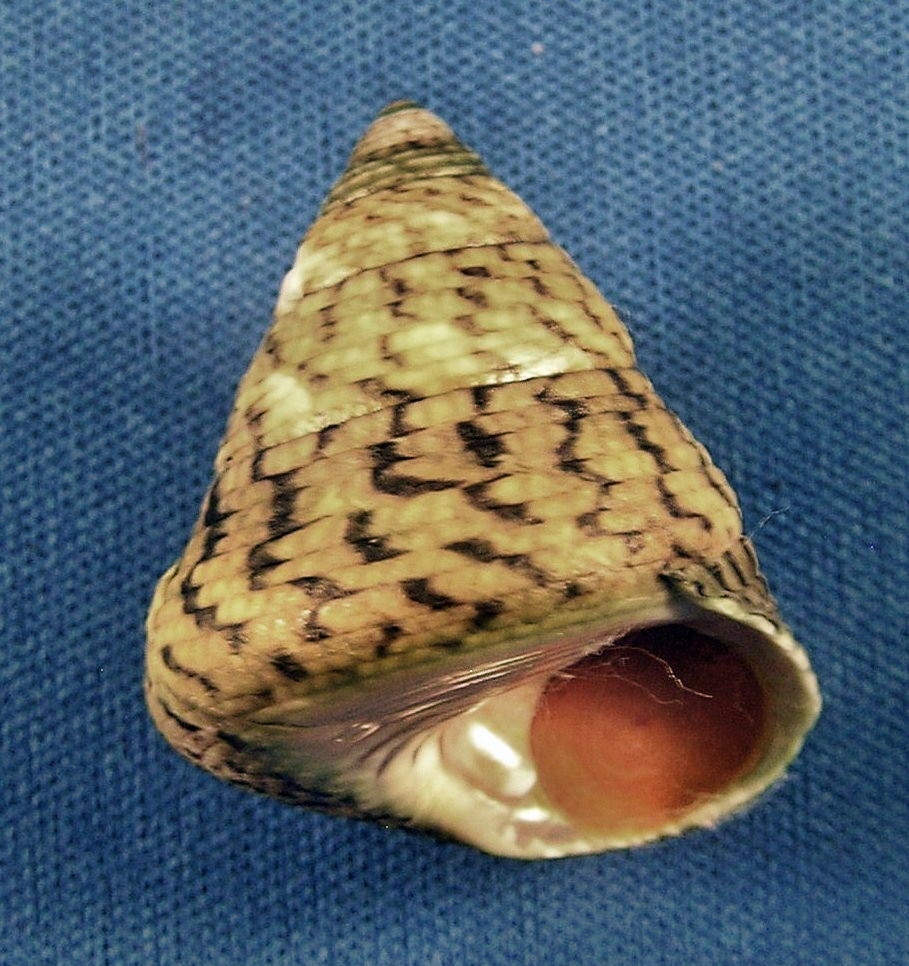
- Drawing with an apertural view of a shell of Tegula pellisserpentis

Scientific classification
- Kingdom: Animalia
- Phylum: Mollusca
- Class: Gastropoda
- Subclass: Vetigastropoda
- Order: Trochida
- Family: Tegulidae
- Genus: Tegula
- Species: T. pellisserpentis

Binomial name
- Tegula pellisserpentis (Wood, 1828)

Synonyms
- Chlorostoma pellisserpentis (Wood, 1828); Tegula elegans Lesson, 1832; Trochus pellis-serpentis Wood, 1828 (original description); Trochus strigillatus Anton

= Tegula pellisserpentis =

Species of gastropod

Tegula pellisserpentis, common name the serpent-tongue tegula, is a species of sea snail, a marine gastropod mollusk in the family Tegulidae.

== Description ==
The size of the shell varies between 15 mm and 45 mm. The very thick, solid and heavy, imperforate shell has a conical and elevated shape. Its color is yellowish or pinkish, marked with narrow angular patches or interrupted longitudinal oblique stripes of black. The spire is strictly conical. The apex is acute. The sutures are linear. The eight whorls are encircled by weakly granose lirae, separated by narrow impressed lines. The periphery is nearly smooth. The base of the shell is smooth or lirate, and eroded in front of the oblique aperture. The outer lip is thick within, smooth, bevelled to an edge. The oblique columella bears in the middle a heavy tubercle, and is at the base less prominently toothed.

== Distribution ==
This species occurs in the Pacific Ocean from El Salvador to Colombia.
