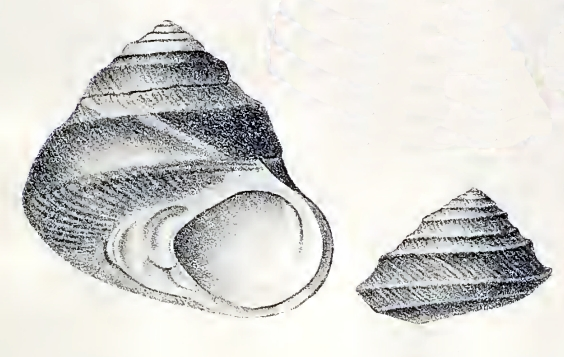
- Drawing with two views of Tegula luctuosa

Scientific classification
- Kingdom: Animalia
- Phylum: Mollusca
- Class: Gastropoda
- Subclass: Vetigastropoda
- Order: Trochida
- Family: Tegulidae
- Genus: Tegula
- Species: T. luctuosa

Binomial name
- Tegula luctuosa (d'Orbigny, 1841)

Synonyms
- Chlorostoma luctuosum (d'Orbigny, 1841); Chlorostoma tropidophorum A. Adams, 1851; Trochus bicarinatus Potiez, V.L.V. & A.L.G. Michaud, 1838; Trochus carinatus Koch in Philippi; Trochus luctuosus d'Orbigny, 1841 (original combination)

= Tegula luctuosa =

Species of gastropod

Tegula luctuosa is a species of sea snail, a marine gastropod mollusk in the family Tegulidae.

== Description ==
The height of the shell attains 35 mm, its diameter 44 mm. The solid, heavy shell is depressed, broadly umbilicate, and has a conoidal shape. It is black or purplish. The spire is more or less depressed. The sutures are linear. The shell contains 5 to 6 whorls. The upper ones have a strong carina midway between the sutures. The body whorl is carinated at the periphery and above, generally showing a less prominent carina on the base near the periphery. The aperture is oblique. The arcuate columella is oblique. The umbilicus is broad and deep, with a spiral rib within. This species is characterized by its wide umbilicus and strongly keeled whorls.

== Distribution ==
This species occurs in the Pacific Ocean between Peru and Chile.
