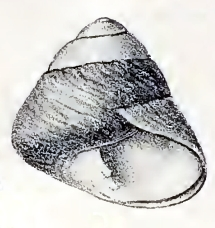
- Drawing of a shell of Chlorostoma lischkei

Scientific classification
- Kingdom: Animalia
- Phylum: Mollusca
- Class: Gastropoda
- Subclass: Vetigastropoda
- Order: Trochida
- Superfamily: Trochoidea
- Family: Tegulidae
- Genus: Chlorostoma
- Species: C. lischkei

Binomial name
- Chlorostoma lischkei (Tapparone-Canefri, 1874)

Synonyms
- Chlorostoma argyrostoma lischkei (Tapparone-Canefri, C.E., 1874); Tegula lischkei Tapparone-Canefri, 1874; Tegula (Chlorostoma) argyrostoma lischkei Tapparone-Canefri, 1874

= Chlorostoma lischkei =

Species of gastropod

Chlorostoma lischkei is a species of sea snail, a marine gastropod mollusk in the family Tegulidae.

== Description ==
The size of the shell attains 24 mm. The shell is without longitudinal folds. It is olive-colored with lead-colored apex. The umbilicus is covered.

== Distribution ==
This species occurs in the Northwest Pacific Ocean.
