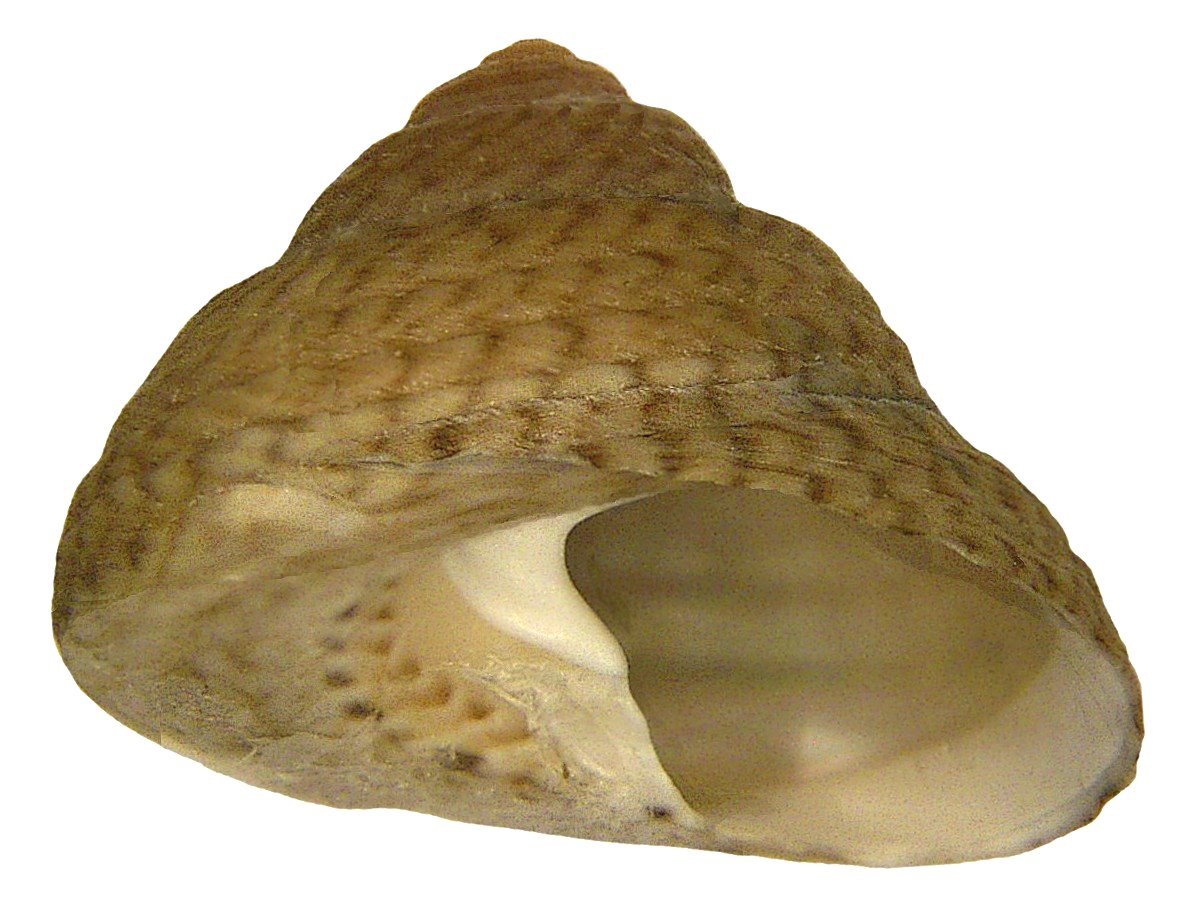

Scientific classification
- Kingdom: Animalia
- Phylum: Mollusca
- Class: Gastropoda
- Subclass: Vetigastropoda
- Order: Trochida
- Family: Tegulidae
- Genus: Tegula
- Species: T. excavata

Binomial name
- Tegula excavata (Lamarck, 1822)

Synonyms
- Agathistoma excavata Lamarck, 1822; Chlorostoma excavata Lamarck, 1822; Chlorostoma excavatum Lamarck, 1822; Neomphalius excavata Lamarck, 1822; Omphalius excavata Lamarck, 1822; Trochus cinerea Costa, E.M. da, 1778; Trochus cinereus da Costa, 1778; Trochus excavatus Lamarck, 1822 (original description)

= Tegula excavata =

Species of gastropod

Tegula excavata, common name the green-based tegula, is a species of sea snail, a marine gastropod mollusk in the family Tegulidae.

== Description ==
The height of the shell varies between 12 mm and 18 mm. The umbilicate shell has a conical shape. It is dull grayish, olivaceous or pinkish, longitudinally lineolate with a darker shade, frequently appearing unicolored. The spire is conic. The apex is eroded or acute. The six or seven whorls are flattened, scarcely convex, very obsoletely spirally grooved. The body whorl is acutely carinated at the periphery, flat or plano-concave beneath, concentrically lirate. The large aperture is subhorizontal, iridescent within. The columella is sinuous, unidentate in the middle, green, half surrounding the umbilicus with a sickle-shaped callus. The umbilicus is funnel-shaped, green or white within, broadly expanding at its opening.

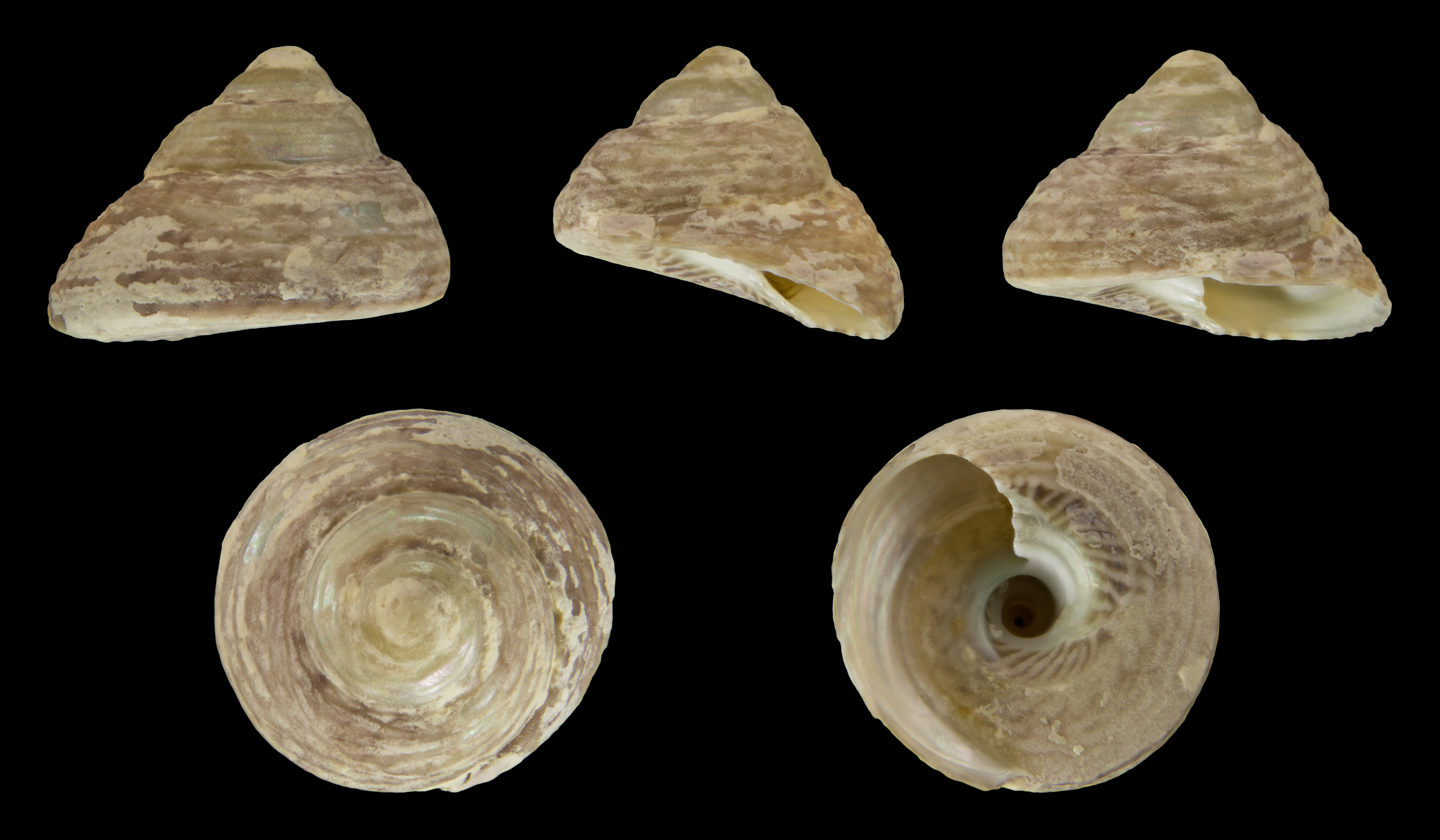
Five views of a shell of Tegula excavata

== Distribution ==
This species occurs in the Gulf of Mexico, the Caribbean Sea and the Lesser Antilles.
