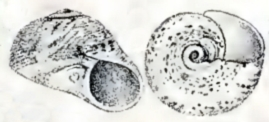
- Drawing with two views of a shell of Tegula cooksoni

Scientific classification
- Kingdom: Animalia
- Phylum: Mollusca
- Class: Gastropoda
- Subclass: Vetigastropoda
- Order: Trochida
- Family: Tegulidae
- Genus: Tegula
- Species: T. cooksoni

Binomial name
- Tegula cooksoni (E.A. Smith, 1877)

Synonyms
- Chlorostoma cooksoni (Smith, 1877); Tegula (Agathistoma) cooksoni (E.A. Smith, 1877); Trochus (Omphalius) cooksoni Smith, 1877 (original combination)

= Tegula cooksoni =

Species of gastropod

Tegula cooksoni is a species of sea snail, a marine gastropod mollusk in the family Tegulidae.

== Description ==
The height of the shell attains 4 mm, its diameter 8 mm. The shell is deeply umbilicated. suborbicular and slightly conoidal. Its color is brown, variegated with rosy, painted with white lines articulated with black. The coloration of this species is not very definite. The upper surface is blotched irregularly with pink and brown, and some spiral articulated lines. The base is a trifle paler The 4½ whorls are nearly smooth, and slightly convex. They are sculptured with few delicate, fine spiral striae, which are most conspicuous on the base. The body whorl is convex above, and slightly depressed beneath the suture, at the periphery flattened and biangulate. The base of the shell is nearly flat, delicately spirally striate, around the umbilicus encircled with a shallow groove. The umbilicus is white, deep, surrounded by a whitish callus forming a faint tooth at the base of the columella. It is bordered by a shallow sulcus on the whorl. The aperture is suborbicular. The columella is arcuate, joined above to the whorl by a callus, which extends upward some distance on the whorl, and also spreads out within the aperture.

== Distribution ==
This species occurs in the Pacific Ocean off the Galapagos Islands and Cocos Island, Costa Rica
