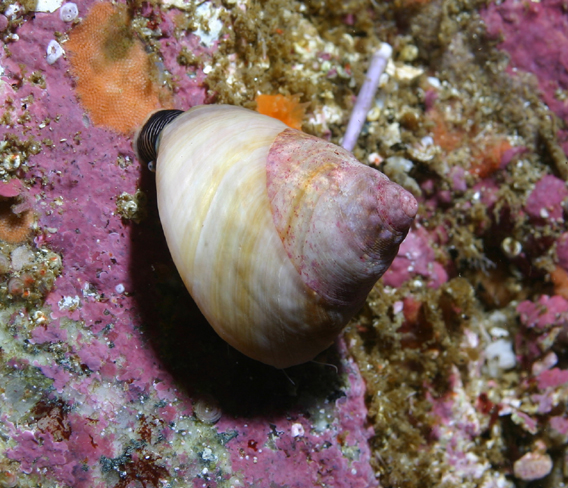
- A live individual of Tegula pulligo in situ

Scientific classification
- Domain: Eukaryota
- Kingdom: Animalia
- Phylum: Mollusca
- Class: Gastropoda
- Subclass: Vetigastropoda
- Order: Trochida
- Superfamily: Trochoidea
- Family: Tegulidae
- Genus: Tegula
- Species: T. pulligo

Binomial name
- Tegula pulligo (Gmelin, 1791)

Synonyms
- Chlorostoma pulligo (Gmelin, 1791); Trochus marcidus Gould, 1852; Trochus pulligo Gmelin, 1791 (original combination)

= Tegula pulligo =

Species of gastropod

Tegula pulligo, common name the dusky tegula, is a species of medium-sized sea snail with gills and an operculum, a marine gastropod mollusc in the family Tegulidae.

This is an Eastern Pacific Ocean species.

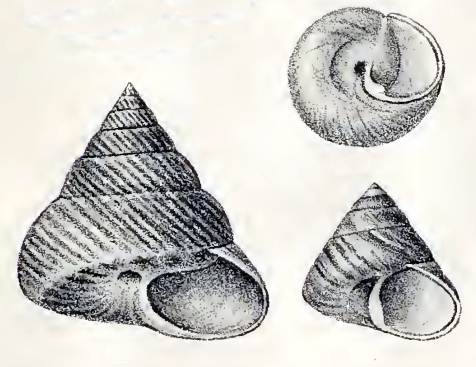
Tegula pulligo

== Description ==
The size of the shell varies between 19 mm and 41 mm. The solid shell is deeply and widely umbilicate. It has a conical shape with an elevated spire. Its color is dull purplish or brown, when worn often orange, obliquely streaked with white or unicolored. The seven whorls are flattened, the upper ones finely spirally striate and sometimes very obsoletely plicate. The remainder is smooth, obliquely finely striate. The base of the shell is flattened, slightly convex, obliquely streaked, concave and white around the umbilicus. The body whorl is bluntly angled at the periphery. The aperture is very oblique, smaller than usual in this genus. The thin columella is obtusely dentate, ending above in a white callus which partly covers the umbilicus. There is no spiral ridge within the umbilicus.

== Distribution ==
This species occurs in the Pacific Ocean from Alaska to Baja California, Mexico.

It is usually found on kelp; once it falls to the bottom, it is easy prey for a number of predators, including sea stars, whelks, and octopus.
