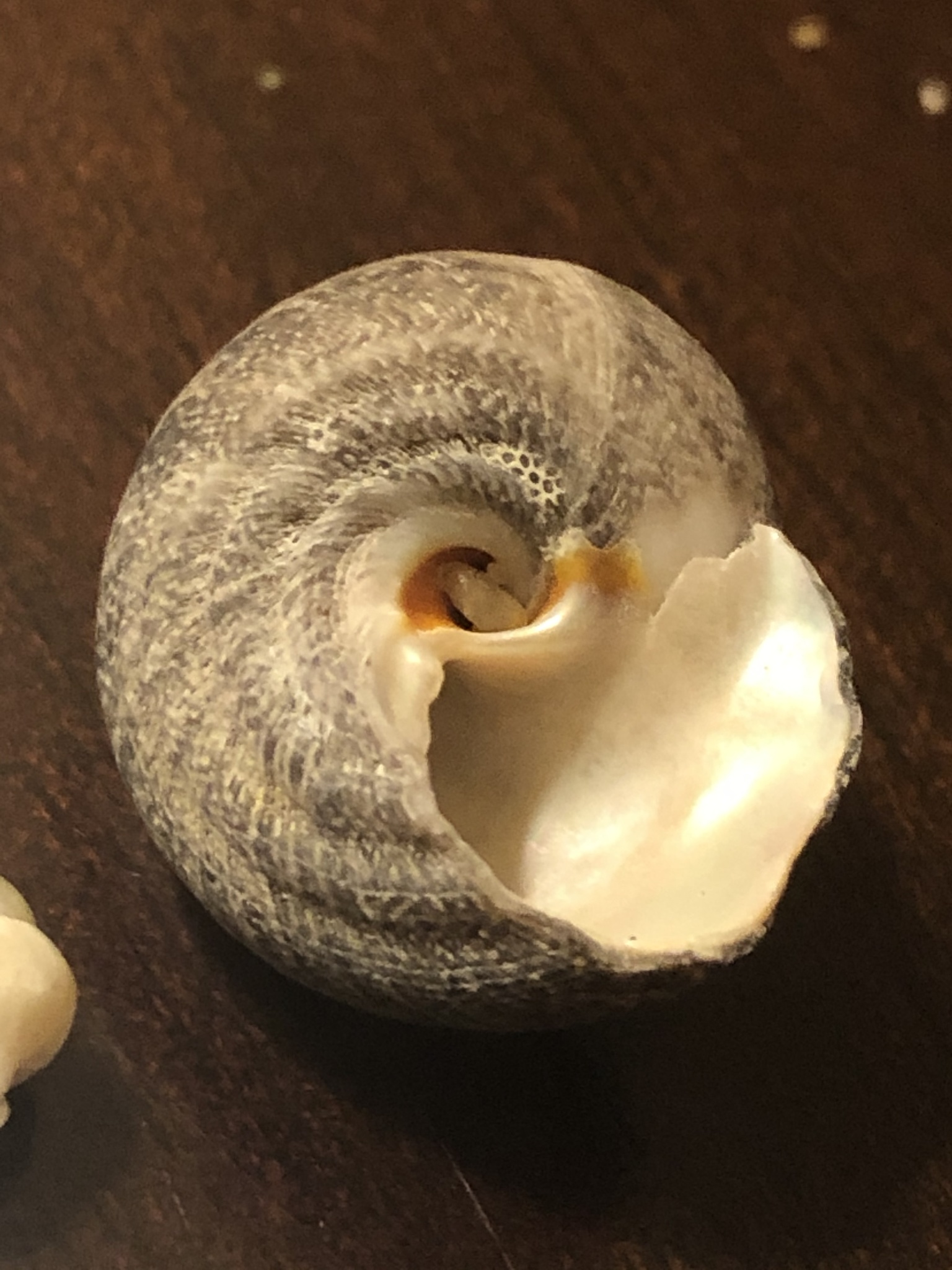

Scientific classification
- Kingdom: Animalia
- Phylum: Mollusca
- Class: Gastropoda
- Subclass: Vetigastropoda
- Order: Trochida
- Family: Tegulidae
- Genus: Tegula
- Species: T. aureotincta

Binomial name
- Tegula aureotincta (Forbes, 1850)

= Tegula aureotincta =

Species of gastropod

Tegula aureotincta, common name the gilded tegula, is a species of sea snail, a marine gastropod mollusk in the family Tegulidae.

== Description ==
The size of the shell varies between 20 mm and 40 mm. The shell is broad and low. The spire feels rough. Its sculpture consists of low, spiral ridges, especially on the body whorl and of diagonal ridges. The color of the spire is dark gray or olive. The base of the shell has a bright yellow or orange skin around the deep umbilicus.

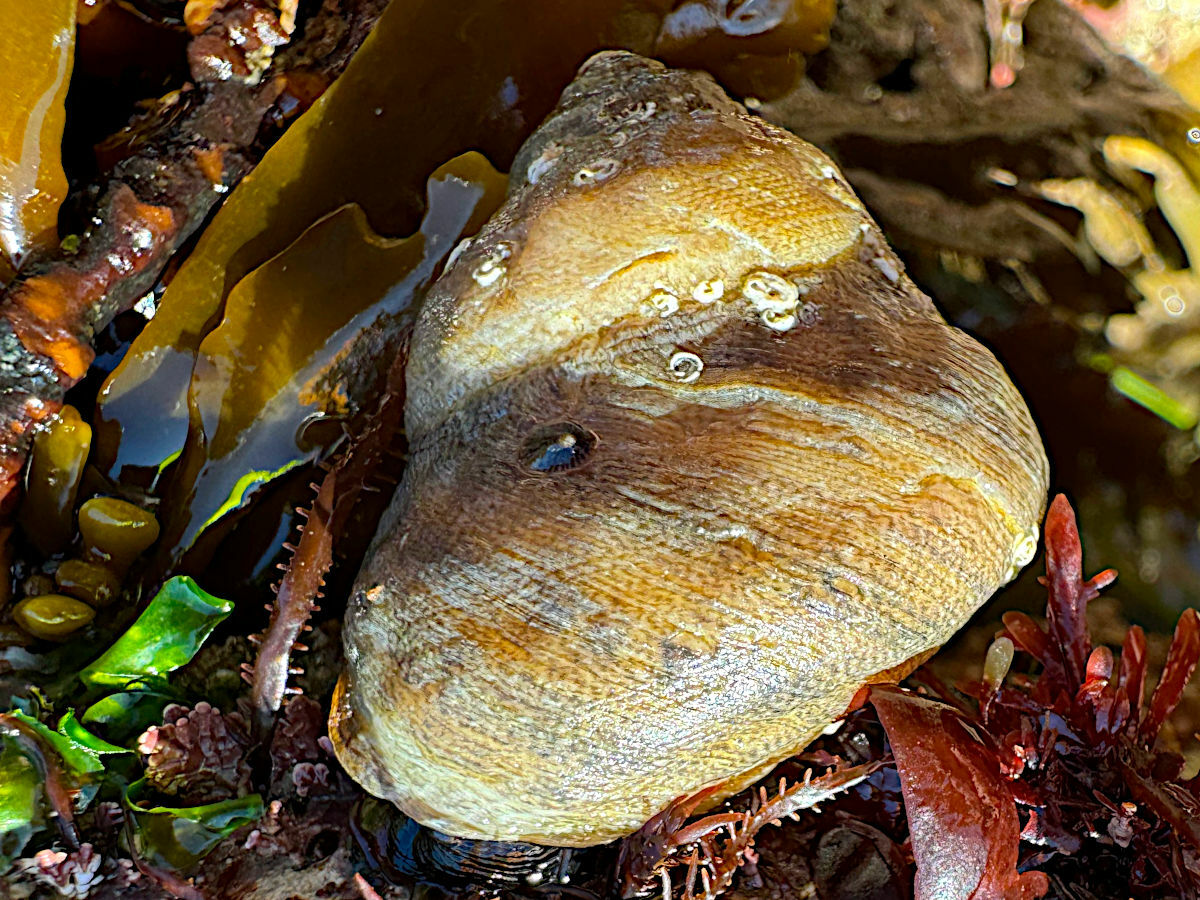
upperside, Point Loma, San Diego

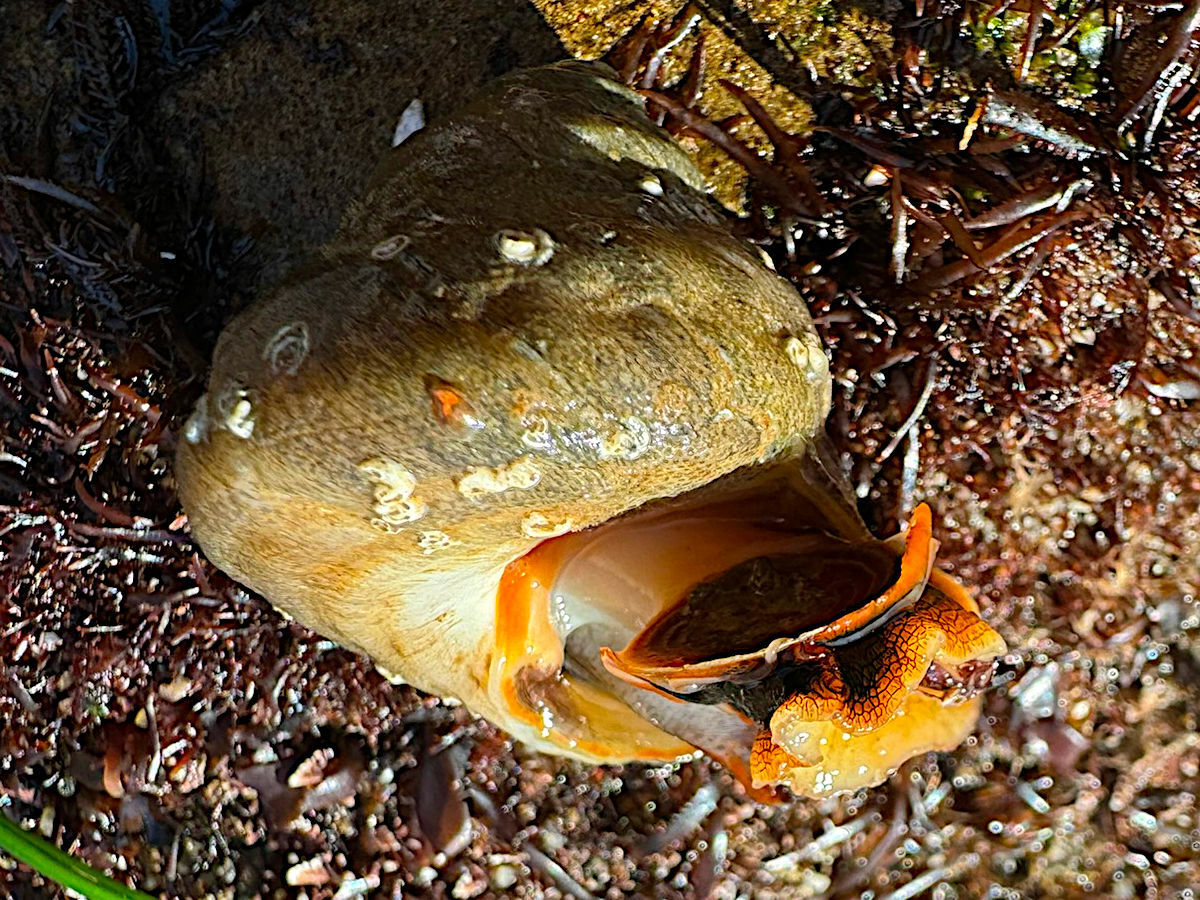
underside, Point Loma, San Diego

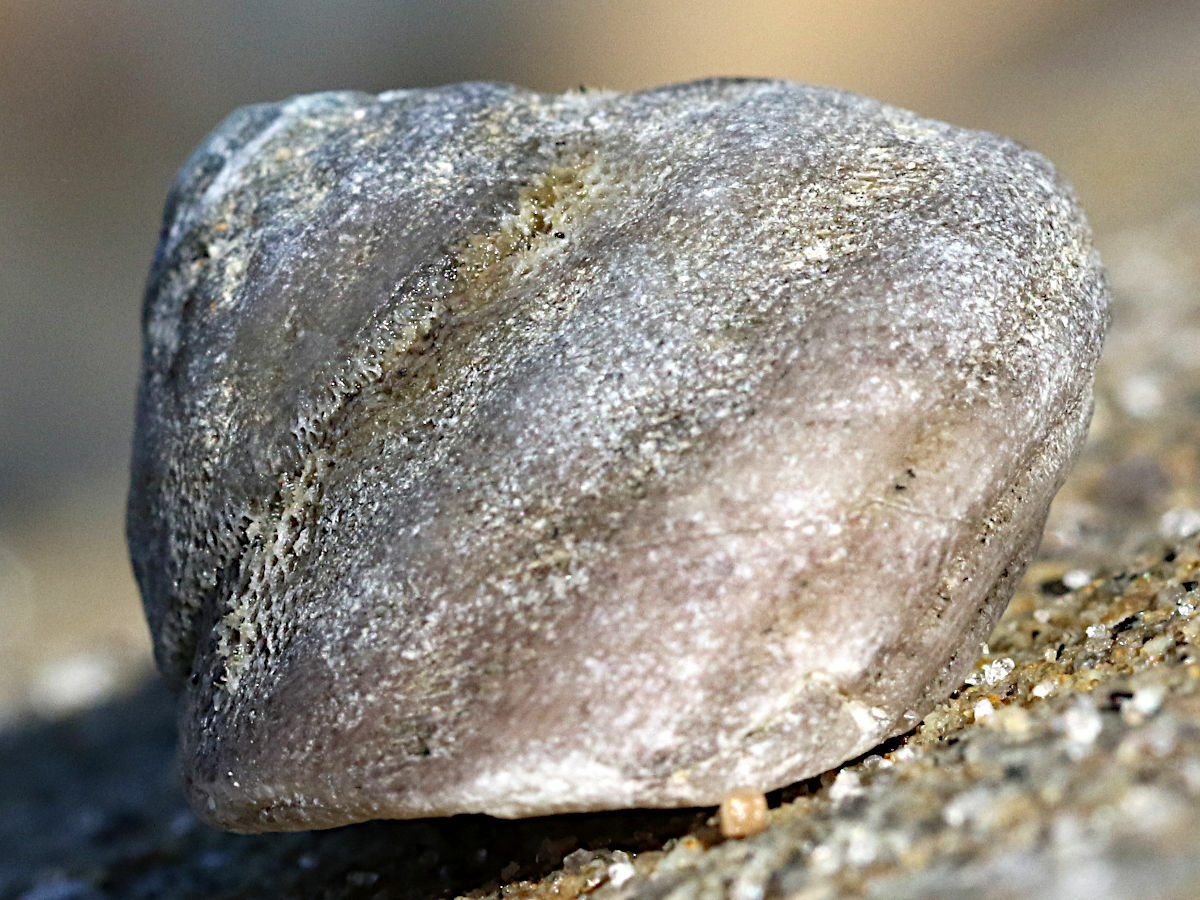
upperside, Torrey Pines State Beach

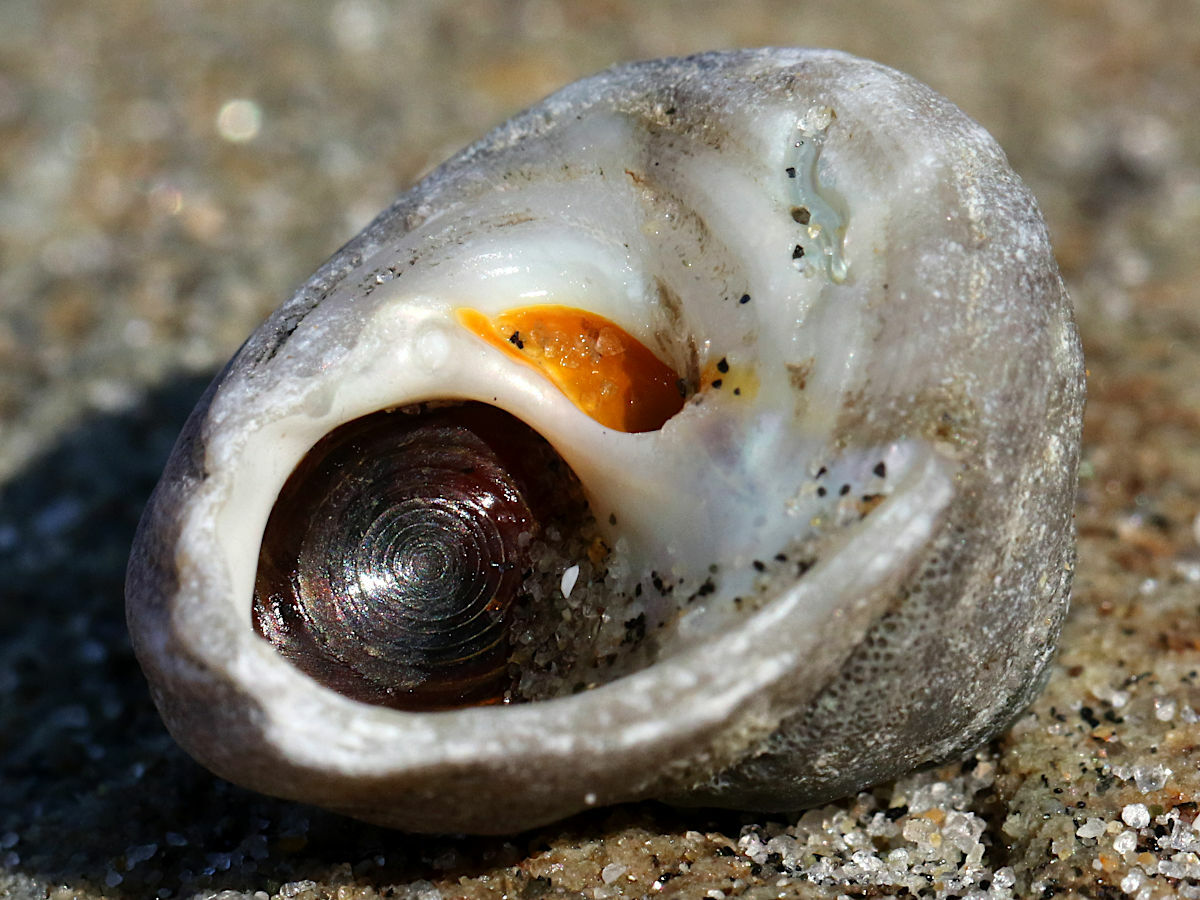
underside, Torrey Pines State Beach

== Distribution ==
This species occurs in the Pacific Ocean in the low intertidal zones and on adjacent rocky subtidal shores off Southern California, USA and Mexico
