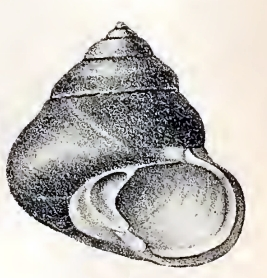
- Drawing of a shell of Tegula euryomphala

Scientific classification
- Kingdom: Animalia
- Phylum: Mollusca
- Class: Gastropoda
- Subclass: Vetigastropoda
- Order: Trochida
- Family: Tegulidae
- Genus: Tegula
- Species: T. euryomphala

Binomial name
- Tegula euryomphala (Jonas, 1844)

Synonyms
- Chlorostoma euryomphalus (Jonas, 1844); Trochus euryomphalus Jonas, 1844 (original combination); Trochus kieneri Hupe, in Gay; Turbo Iuctuosus var. Kiener

= Tegula euryomphala =

Species of gastropod

Tegula euryomphala is a species of sea snail, a marine gastropod mollusk in the family Tegulidae.

== Description ==
The size of the shell varies between 23 mm and 40 mm. The solid, umbilicate shell has a conical shape. It is black or purplish. The elevated spire is conical. The about six whorls are somewhat convex, and nearly smooth. The body whorl is more or less angulate at the periphery, sometimes obtusely bicarinate. The oblique aperture is rather small. The columella is arcuate, spreading above in a white callus. The umbilicus is white within, somewhat funnel-shaped, bearing a spiral rib which terminates in a denticle in the middle of the columella.

== Distribution ==
This species occurs in the Pacific Ocean off Peru to Chile.
