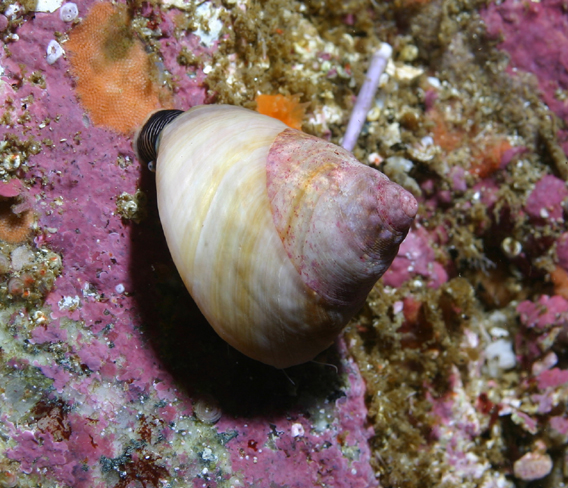
- A live individual of Tegula pulligo in situ

Scientific classification
- Kingdom: Animalia
- Phylum: Mollusca
- Class: Gastropoda
- Subclass: Vetigastropoda
- Order: Trochida
- Superfamily: Trochoidea
- Family: Tegulidae
- Genus: Tegula; Lesson, 1835

Type species
- Tegula elegans Lesson, 1832

Synonyms
- Chlorostoma Swainson, 1840 (junior synonym); Neomphalius P. Fischer, 1885 (unnecessary substitute name for...); Omphalius Philippi, 1847; Promartynia Dall, 1909; Trochus (Chlorostoma) Swainson, 1840(original rank); Trochus (Omphalius) Philippi, 1847

= Tegula (gastropod) =

Genus of small to medium-sized sea snails

Tegula is a genus of small to medium-sized sea snails, marine gastropod molluscs in the family Tegulidae.

== Biology ==
The function of the heart in Tegula snails may have a critical importance for their temperature tolerance.

== Species ==
Species within the genus Tegula include:

- Tegula argyrostoma (Gmelin, 1791)
- Tegula atra (Lesson, 1830)
- Tegula aureotincta (Forbes, 1850) - gilded tegula
- Tegula bergeroni McLean, 1970
- Tegula brunnea Philippi, 1848 - brown tegula:
- Tegula cooksoni (E.A. Smith, 1877)
- Tegula corrugata (A. Adams, 1853)
- Tegula corteziana Mclean, 1970
- Tegula corvus (Philippi, 1850)
- Tegula eiseni Jordan, 1936 - banded tegula, western banded tegula
- Tegula euryomphala (Jonas, 1844)
- Tegula excavata (Lamarck, 1822) - green-base tegula
- Tegula felipensis McLean, 1970
- Tegula funebralis (A. Adams, 1855) - black tegula:
- Tegula gallina (Forbes, 1850) - speckled tegula
- Tegula globulus (Carpenter, 1857)
- Tegula gruneri (Philippi, 1849) - gem tegula
- Tegula hotessieriana (d'Orbigny, 1842) - Caribbean tegula
- Tegula ignota Ramírez-Böhme, 1976
- Tegula kusairo Yamazaki, Hirano, Chiba & Fukuda, 2020
- Tegula ligulata (Menke, 1850)
- Tegula luctuosa (d'Orbigny, 1841)
- Tegula mariana Dall, 1919
- Tegula melaleucos (Jonas, 1844)
- Tegula montereyi (Kiener, 1850) Monterey tegula:
- Tegula nigerrima (Gmelin, 1791)
- Tegula panamensis (Philippi, 1849)
- Tegula patagonica (d'Orbigny, 1840)
- Tegula pellisserpentis Wood, 1828
- Tegula pfeifferi (Philiippi, 1846)
- Tegula picta McLean, 1970
- Tegula pulligo (Gmelin, 1791) - dusky tegula
- Tegula puntagordana Weisbord, 1962
- Tegula quadricostata (W. Wood, 1828)
- Tegula regina Stearns, 1892 - queen tegula
- Tegula rubroflammulata (Koch in Philippi, 1843)
- Tegula rugata (A. Gould, 1861)
- Tegula rugosa (A. Adams, 1853)
- Tegula snodgrassi (Pilsbry & Vanatta, 1902)
- Tegula tridentata (Potiez & Michaud, 1838)
- Tegula turbinata (A. Adams, 1853)
- Tegula verdispira J. H. McLean, 1970
- Tegula verrucosa McLean, 1970
- Tegula xanthostigma (A. Adams, 1853)

Species brought into synonymy

- Tegula argyrostoma (Gmelin, 1791): synonym of Chlorostoma lischkei (Tapparone-Canefri, 1874)
- Tegula elegans Lesson, 1832: synonym of Tegula pellisserpentis (Wood, 1828)
- Tegula fasciata (Born, 1778) - silky tegula: synonym of Agathistoma fasciatum (Born, 1778) (recombination)
- Tegula fuscescens Philippi, R.A., 1845: synonym of Tegula patagonica (Orbigny, A.V.M.D. d', 1835)
- Tegula ligulata (Menke, 1850): synonym of Tegula ligulata mariamadrae Pilsbry & Lowe, 1932
- Tegula lischkei (Tapparone-Canefri, 1874): synonym of Chlorostoma lischkei (Tapparone-Canefri, 1874)
- Tegula lividomaculata (C. B. Adams, 1845) - West Indian tegula: synonym of Agathistoma lividomaculatum (C. B. Adams, 1845) (recombination)
- Tegula maculostriata (C. B. Adams): synonym of Tegula hotessieriana (d’Orbigny, 1842)
- Tegula mendella McLean, J.H., 1964: synonym of Tegula eiseni Jordan, 1936
- Tegula phalera Weisbord, 1962: synonym of Tegula puntagordana Weisbord, 1962
- Tegula rustica (Gmelin, 1791): synonym of Omphalius rusticus (Gmelin, 1791)
- Tegula scalaris (C.B. Adams, 1845): synonym of Tegula lividomaculata (C. B. Adams, 1845)
- Tegula trilirata Weisbord, 1962: synonym of Tegula puntagordana Weisbord, 1962
- Tegula umbilicata Lischke, C.E. in Iwakawa, 1919: synonym of Chlorostoma argyrostoma turbinata (Adams, A., 1853); synonym of Tegula argyrostoma turbinatum A. Adams, 1853
- Tegula viridula (Gmelin, 1791): synonym of Agathistoma viridulum (Gmelin, 1791)
