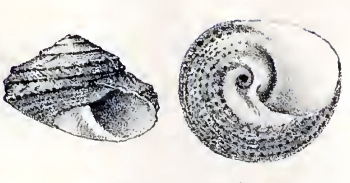
- Drawing with two views of a shell of Tegula mariana

Scientific classification
- Kingdom: Animalia
- Phylum: Mollusca
- Class: Gastropoda
- Subclass: Vetigastropoda
- Order: Trochida
- Family: Tegulidae
- Genus: Tegula
- Species: T. mariana

Binomial name
- Tegula mariana (Dall, 1919)

Synonyms
- Chlorostoma coronulatum C. B. Adams, Pilsbry, 1889; Chlorostoma coronulatum var. turbinatum Pease, Pilsbry, 1889; Omphalius marianus Dall, 1919 (original description); Omphalius turbinatus Pease, 1869; Tegula (Agathistoma) mariana mariana (Dall, 1919); Tegula (Omphalius) mariana Dall, Pilsbry and Lowe, 1932

= Tegula mariana =

Species of gastropod

Tegula mariana is a species of sea snail, a marine gastropod mollusk in the family Tegulidae.

== Description ==
The height of the shell varies between 8.9 mm, its diameter 10.5 mm. The shell has a shiny surface. Its color is dingy white, with broad radiating flames of brown or red above irregularly maculated below, sometimes nearly unicolored, pinkish, with the lirae of the base articulated with red and white dots. The spire is either conic or depressed. The sutures are either simple, linear, or somewhat canaliculate. There is a concavity in the subsutural area. The about 5 whorls are spirally transversed by excessively minute spiral striae. The body whorl has an acute nodulous carina at the periphery, and another angulation or keel at the middle of the upper surface of the whorl and continued upon the spire, and which is usually nodose on the body whorl. There is usually, too, a third ridge or carina, generally coarsely nodose, between the two already described. The base of the shell is more or less convex, generally shows microscopic concentric striae under a lens, and has about 5 low, narrow, separated spiral lirulae. The columella and the inside of the umbilicus are either green or white.

This species is thus characterized by the two angulations on the body whorl and the fine, spiral sculpture between the two keels.

== Distribution ==
This species occurs in the Pacific Ocean and is common under rocks at high-tide level from Baja California, Mexico, to Peru
