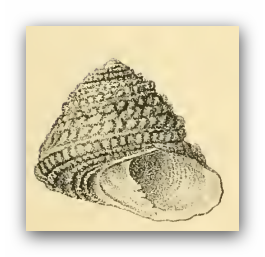
- Drawing of an apertural view of a shell of Tegula quadricostata

Scientific classification
- Kingdom: Animalia
- Phylum: Mollusca
- Class: Gastropoda
- Subclass: Vetigastropoda
- Order: Trochida
- Family: Tegulidae
- Genus: Tegula
- Species: T. quadricostata

Binomial name
- Tegula quadricostata (W. Wood, 1828)

Synonyms
- Chlorostoma quadricostatum (W. Wood, 1828); Monodonta catenifera Pot. & Mich.; Trochus quadricostatus W. Wood, 1828 (original combination); Trochus torulosus Philippi

= Tegula quadricostata =

Species of gastropod

Tegula quadricostata is a species of sea snail, a marine gastropod mollusk in the family Tegulidae.

== Description ==
The size of the shell varies between 15 mm and 30 mm. The thick, solid, umbilicate shell has a conical shape and has a blackish color. The spire is conoidal. The apex is rather blunt. The sutures are canaliculate. The six whorls are encircled by four coarsely tuberculose ribs on the upper surface; the upper two contiguous, sometimes coalescent. The base of the shell shows 3 or 4 separated smaller beaded ribs, the broad interstices both above and below densely, finely spirally striate. The periphery is obtusely angular. The base is nearly flat. The oblique aperture is smooth within. The oblique columella is sinuous and bidentate. The umbilicus is surrounded by a white callus, bearing inside a strong spiral rib which terminates in a denticle about the middle of the columella.

== Distribution ==
This species occurs in the Pacific Ocean between Peru and Chile.
