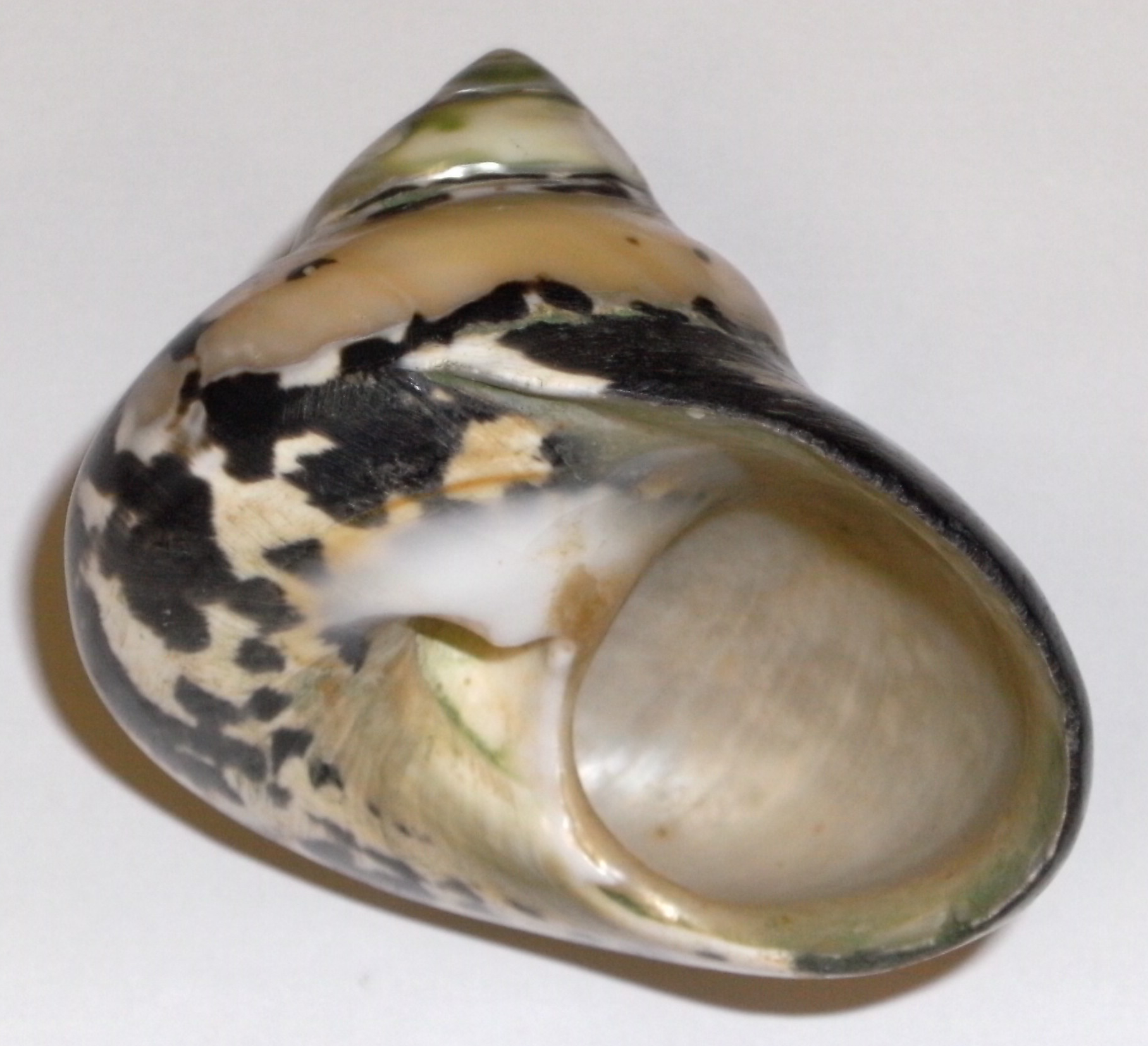
- Cittarium pica

Scientific classification
- Kingdom: Animalia
- Phylum: Mollusca
- Class: Gastropoda
- Subclass: Vetigastropoda
- Order: Trochida
- Superfamily: Trochoidea
- Family: Tegulidae; Kuroda, Habe & Oyama, 1971

Genera
- See text

Synonyms
- Pyramidinae Gray, 1847 (invalid: type genus a junior homonym); Tegulinae Kuroda, Habe & Oyama, 1971

= Tegulidae =

Family of gastropods

Tegulidae is a family of small to large sea snails, marine gastropod mollusks in the superfamily Trochoidea (according to the taxonomy of the Gastropoda by Bouchet & Rocroi, 2005).

This was for a long time considered to be a subfamily (Tegulinae) within the family Turbinidae.

== Genera ==
Genera within the family Tegulidae include:

- Agathistoma Olsson & Harbison, 1953
- Callistele Cotton & Godfrey, 1935
- Carolesia Güller & Zelaya, 2014
- Cittarium Philippi, 1847
- Norrisia Bayle, 1880
- Rochia Gray, 1857
- Tectus Montfort, 1810
- Tegula Lesson, 1832

Genera brought into synonymy

- Cardinalia Gray, 1842: synonym of Tectus Montfort, 1810
- Chlorostoma Swainson, 1840: synonym of Tegula Lesson, 1832 (junior synonym)
- Livona Gray, 1842: synonym of Cittarium Philippi, 1847
- Meleagris Montfort, 1810: synonym of Cittarium Philippi, 1847 (invalid: not Meleagris Linnaeus, 1758 [Aves]; Cittarium is a replacement name)
- Neomphalius P. Fischer, 1885: synonym of Tegula Lesson, 1832 (unnecessary substitute name for Omphalius Philippi, 1847, by Fischer treated as a junior homonym of Omphalia de Haan, 1825)
- Omphalius Philippi, 1847: synonym of Tegula Lesson, 1832
- Promartynia Dall, 1909: synonym of Tegula Lesson, 1832
- Pyramidea Swainson, 1840: synonym of Tectus Montfort, 1810
- Pyramis Schumacher, 1817: synonym of Tectus Montfort, 1810
- Trochiscus G. B. Sowerby I, 1838: synonym of Norrisia Bayle, 1880
