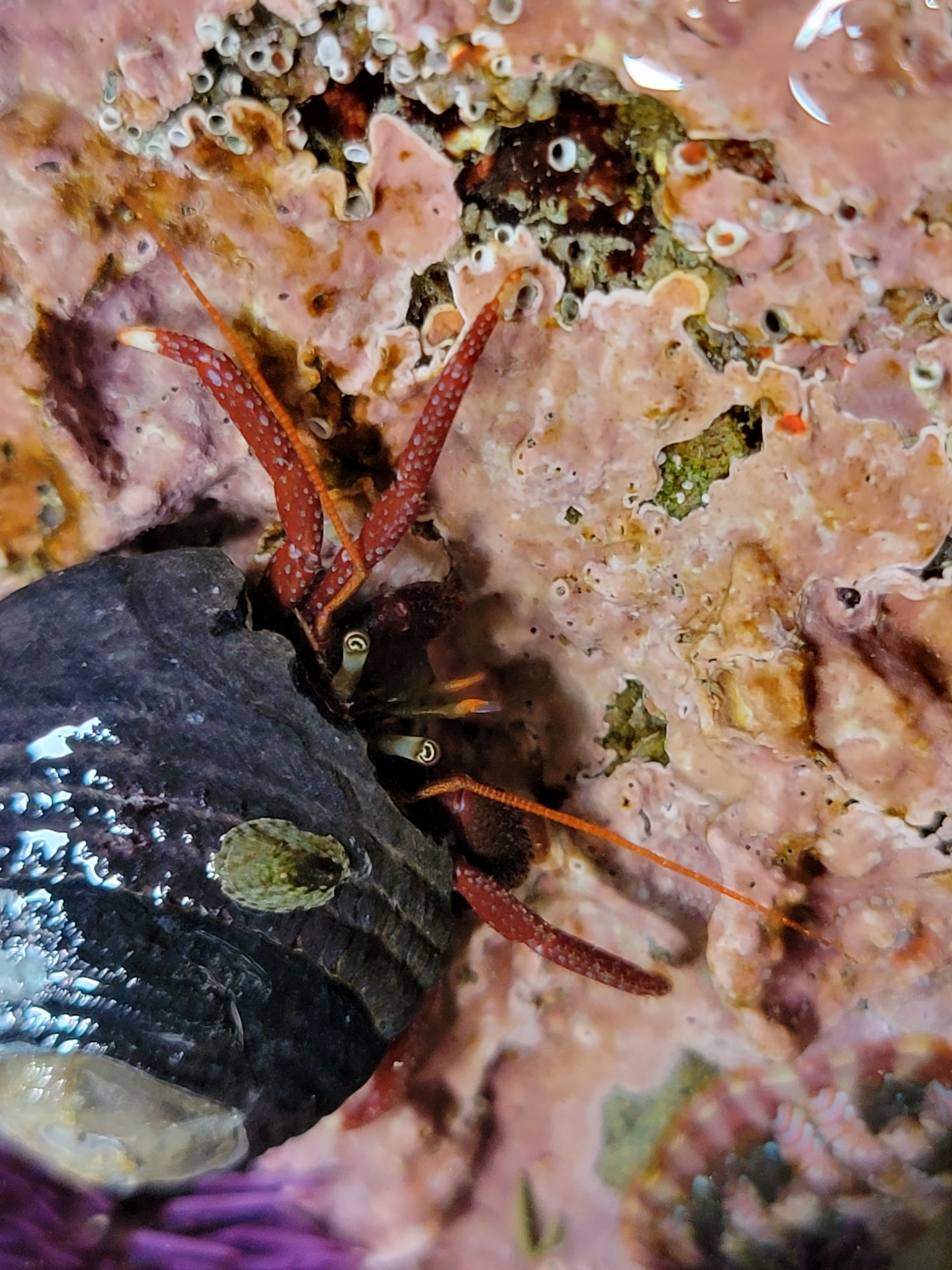

Scientific classification
- Kingdom: Animalia
- Phylum: Arthropoda
- Class: Malacostraca
- Order: Decapoda
- Suborder: Pleocyemata
- Infraorder: Anomura
- Family: Paguridae
- Genus: Pagurus
- Species: P. hemphilli

Binomial name
- Pagurus hemphilli Benedict, 1895

= Pagurus hemphilli =

Species of hermit crab

Pagurus hemphilli is a species of hermit crab in the family Paguridae. It is found in the Eastern Pacific and was described from Monterey, California.

== Description ==
Pagurus. hemphilli is a rich maroon color with small blue dots, yellow-tipped dactyls, gold-ringed corneae, and red to orange-red antennae that lack spots or rings. Juveniles sometimes have white bands on their ambulatory legs. The chelipeds ("claws") are dramatically different in size, with the major cheliped being much larger than the minor cheliped. It is almost totally hairless over its entire body and has a smooth, shiny shield. It has a distinct rostrum that is produced well beyond the carapace lateral frontal lobes. The chela palms are rough with visible bumps. The uropods are asymmetrical, and the carapace can measure up to 15 mm (0.6 in).

Its congener Pagurus granosimanus is similar in appearance, with both being dark in color with light dots, but true to its name, P. hemphilli is more maroon than the olive P. granosimanus. and can also be separated from P. granosimanus based on the comparatively longer length of the outer portion of the carapace, even at the juvenile stage. The legs of the two species are also quite different, with P. hemphilli having legs that are dark red with tiny yellow to blue spots and a white dot at the end, whereas P. granosimanus has olive legs with light blue spots.

== Range ==
Pagurus hemphilli ranges along the North American coast from Alaska to the Central Coast of California. It is more common towards the southernmost extent of its range in Central California.

== Habitat ==
Pagurus hemphilli is found on rocks in shallow water. It mostly occupies the upper subtidal region to a depth of 50 m (160 ft), but can occur in low intertidal pools. P. hemphilli occupies a deeper zone of the shoreline compared to its congeners, Pagurus samuelis, Pagurus granosimanus, and Pagurus hirsutiusculus. It therefore has a comparatively lower tolerance of warm water, experiencing increased mortality from high water temperature, reportedly 50% mortality at 30.1 °C (86.2 °F). In the wild, it prefers waters that do not exceed 20 °C (68 °F).

== Ecology ==
Most commonly, P. hemphilli dwells in the shells of Tegula species, such as Tegula brunnea, Lithopoma species, and Astraea species. To acquire a better shell, P. hemphilli engages in shell fights, with the loser conceding their shell. These shell fights may be intraspecific or with other Pagurus species. In these fights, the larger hermit crab has the advantage.

The shells that this species inhabits are often heavily encrusted with coralline algae and with hitchhikers like the slipper snail Crepidula adunca and the limpet Acmaea mitra. A species of Amphipod in the genus Liljeborgia has been observed residing with this species of hermit crab inside the shell; this commensal occupant remains undescribed.

== Etymology ==
Pagurus hemphilli is named after Henry Hemphill, an amateur American shell collector, malacologist, and member of the San Diego Society of Natural History.
