= P. proximus =

P. proximus may refer to:

- Pachybrachis proximus, a beetle species in the genus Pachybrachis
- Pagurus proximus, a crab species in the genus Pagurus
- Pirata proximus, a wolf spider species in the genus Pirata
- Polybetes proximus, a huntsman spider in the genus Polybetes

== See also ==
- Proximus (disambiguation)
