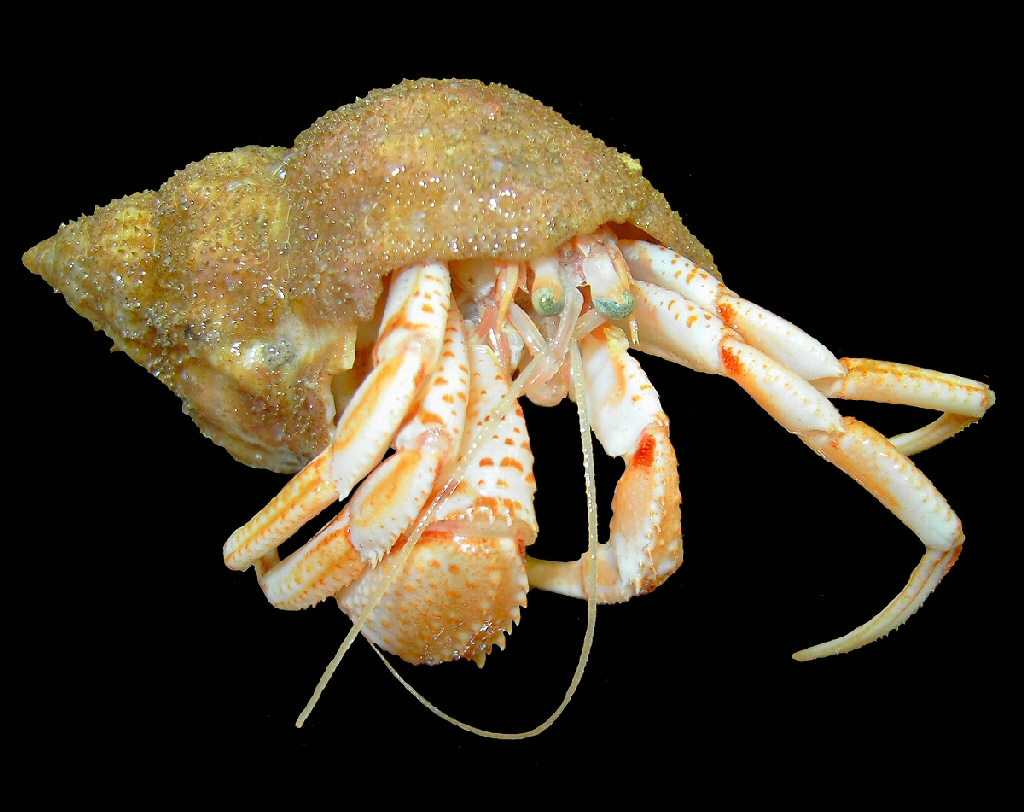
- Common hermit crab (Pagurus bernhardus)
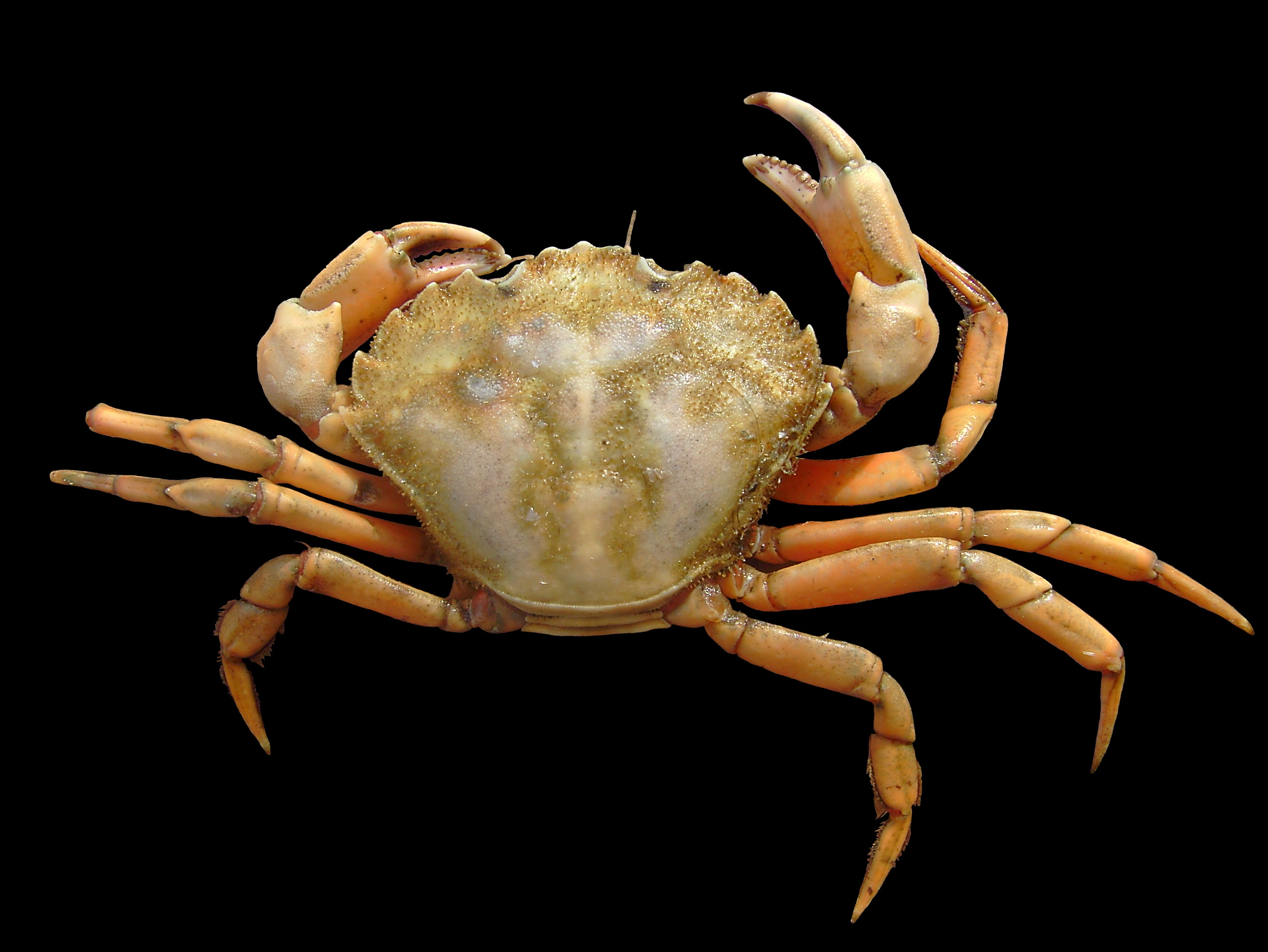
- European green crab (Carcinus maenas)

Scientific classification
- Kingdom: Animalia
- Phylum: Arthropoda
- Class: Malacostraca
- Order: Decapoda
- Suborder: Pleocyemata
- Clade: Reptantia
- Clade: Meiura; Scholtz & Richter, 1995

Infraorders
- Anomura; Brachyura

= Meiura =

Meiura Temporal range: Late Triassic (Norian)-Present, 227–0 Ma

Proposed clade of decapods

Meiura is a proposed clade of decapods containing the infraorders Anomura (hermit crabs) and Brachyura (true crabs). It was named by Gerhard Scholtz and Stefan Richter in 1995.
