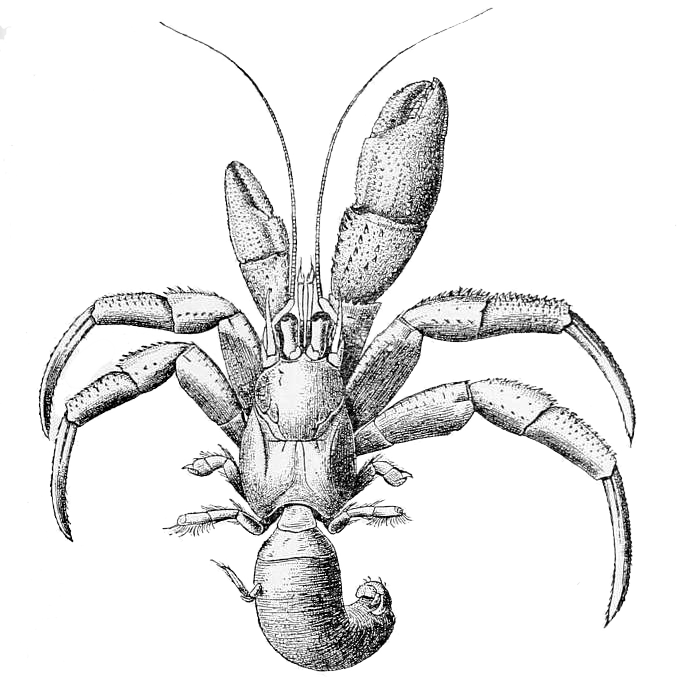

Scientific classification
- Kingdom: Animalia
- Phylum: Arthropoda
- Class: Malacostraca
- Order: Decapoda
- Suborder: Pleocyemata
- Infraorder: Anomura
- Family: Paguridae
- Genus: Pagurus
- Species: P. acadianus

Binomial name
- Pagurus acadianus J. E. Benedict, 1901

= Pagurus acadianus =

Species of crustacean

Pagurus acadianus, the Acadian hermit crab, is a species of hermit crab in the family Paguridae. It is found in Western Atlantic Ocean.

== Distribution ==
The Acadian hermit crab, also known as Pagurus acadianus, can be found in the Western Atlantic Ocean, including areas such as the Vineyard Sound. In addition, the Acadian hermit crab has been cited as the most abundant species of crab in Salisbury Cove, Maine by William C. Grant, Jr, during his extensive study of hermit crabs populating this area in 1961.

== History ==
Pagurus acadianus was first identified in scientific literature by scientist J.E. Benedict in 1901. As examined by Morris H. Roberts, Jr.’s, Benedict was able to differentiate this organism from that of a very similar taxa, Pagurus benhardus, due to physical variations. Benedict observed that Pagurus acadianus had larger eyestalks, shorter fingers of the chelae and sharper chelipeds, all of which are necessary identifiers of the Acadian hermit crab. Taxonomically, the Acadian hermit crab belongs to the Arthropoda phyla. Arthropods belong to the most populous animal phylum, with a recorded million (and counting) species. Arthropods include crustaceans and insects, and are characterized by the breadth of their variation in morphology, or their relationship among similar organisms based on comparisons between physical, chemical and taxonomic similarities. This can often be seen through the use of phylogenetic trees and cladograms. The Acadian hermit crab belongs to the Pagurus genera, along with the hairy hermit crab, or Pagurus pubescens, and the aforementioned Pagurus bernhardus. The abundance of their populations is seasonally dependent, with a peak in richness in the month of June, and a staggering decrease from the months of November to March. In addition, they are most plentiful in seawater temperatures ranging from 32 degrees Fahrenheit to 41 degrees Fahrenheit. The Acadian hermit crab has most often been observed in its fossilized state, with 95.4% of occurrences being recorded as preserved specimen. With only 4.4% of occurrences being living organisms, there is much to know about this creature, and whether its ecological niche is similar to that of its common ancestors.

== Reproduction and development ==
Though very little is known on the specific reproductive behavior of Pagurus acadianus, information on their adolescence was attained by Roberts during his laboratory studies of this species. Roberts found that the incubation period of the larva is approximately 30 days, and the optimal temperature during gestation is 55.4 degrees Fahrenheit. Once they hatch, the size of the eggs is about 0.58 by 0.64 millimeters, and can be distinguished by varying hues of red and yellow coloration, in addition to distinctive eyespots. Both larval and adult Acadian hermit crabs are often confused with the closely related Pagurus berhnardus, or the common marine hermit crab of western Europe, and this comparison has been the focal point of many scientific evaluations, as demonstrated by Benedict's work.

== Habitat ==
As examined by Jennifer E. Angel in her paper, hermit crabs are known to inhabit different shells throughout their lifetimes, switching from shell to shell as a result of growth. Increased growth means increased shell size, because inhabiting a shell that is too small for the crab's body results in an increase in predation and desiccation. Pagurus acadianus are often found inhabiting the shells of Littorina littorea, Thais lapillus, Buccium undatum, and Polinices heros, as concluded by William C Grant, Jr. Larger individuals are often located on elevated areas within the rocky intertidal, which is defined as the area between the highest high tides and the lowest low tides. This area is one of much scientific exploration, due to its accessibility and the adaptations of the organisms that live there. These organisms have to face daily variation in salinity, exposure to sunlight and lack of food. Small individuals can be found on wharf piling and vertical faces of rock. This area can also be defined as the midway region of the rocky intertidal zone. This species of hermit crab has been observed to be quite aggressive, therefore yielding staggering amounts of both intraspecific and interspecific competition. Smaller individuals have been recorded to be more aggressive and dominant, which may be the result of an adaptation to accommodate for smaller size.

== Diet ==
The diet of these organisms, like many other species of hermit crab, includes macroscopic animals and detritus, due to the fact that hermit crabs are classified as omnivorous detritivores. In addition, the bulk of their nutrient intake comes from detritus, classified by many marine scientists as “marine snow”. They consume their food sources through proteolytic enzymes that split carbohydrates and lipids.

== Threats ==
Some of the threats to this species include a microbial infection, which is the result of the fungus Fusarium solani. This fungus causes lesions, attack of the dermis, and mixed inflammatory response, therefore reducing the organism's ability to fight off infection. In addition, larval parasitic nematodes, such as Hysterothylacium aduncum, have been reported to infect this species of hermit crab and hosts itself as a parasite within the individual. One to three of these parasitic nematodes were observed per hermit crab by David J. Marcogliese during his study of nematodes of the past of Eastern Canada, and defined Hysterothylacium aduncum as intestinal parasites. Though not much is known on their affect to the organisms with which they inhabit, their position within the gut of their host may be in order to consume the food that the organism has ingested, causing possible starvation to the host. A common invasive species affecting Pagurus acadianus is the Asian shore crab, Hermigraspus sanguineus, which outcompetes many different species of crab as a result of being aggressive interspecific competitors. The introduction of this invasive species was first observed in New Jersey in 1988. In their work, Christopher P. Bloch, Kevin D. Curry, and John C. Jahoda attribute their occurrence to international commerce and global travel.

== Defenses ==
Acadian hermit crabs have been cited to have two major defense mechanisms: fleeing when approached in the face of predation, or curling up and hiding in their shells. They decide which tactic to use depending on cost–benefit analysis. Like many terrestrial and marine organisms alike, Pagurus acadianus will choose either method depending on the exhaustion of energy or the depleted availability of food during a threat.
