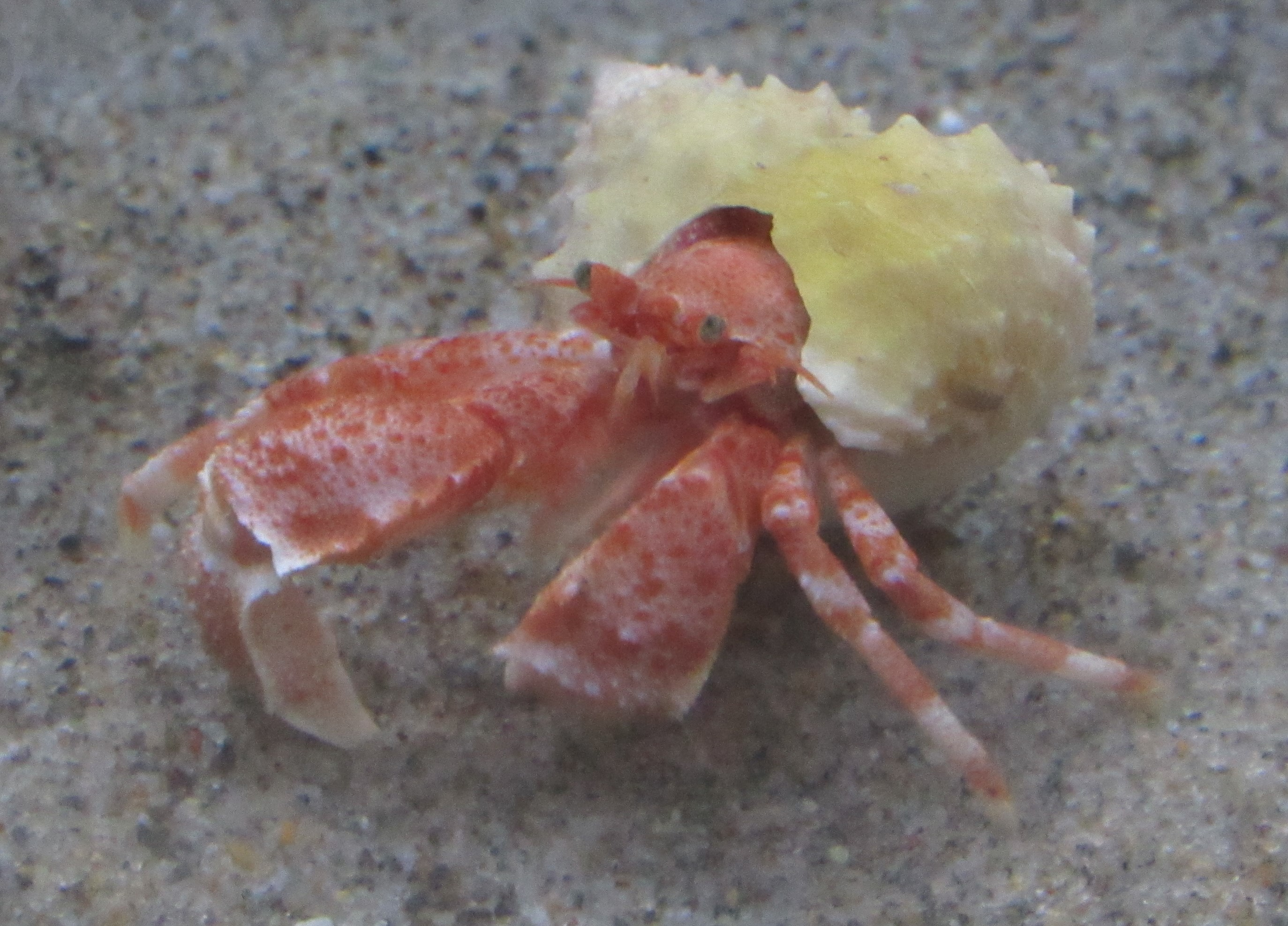

Scientific classification
- Domain: Eukaryota
- Kingdom: Animalia
- Phylum: Arthropoda
- Class: Malacostraca
- Order: Decapoda
- Suborder: Pleocyemata
- Infraorder: Anomura
- Family: Paguridae
- Genus: Pagurus
- Species: P. ikedai

Binomial name
- Pagurus ikedai Lemaitre & Watabe, 2005

= Pagurus ikedai =

Species of crustacean

Pagurus ikedai is a species of right-handed hermit crab in the family Paguridae.
