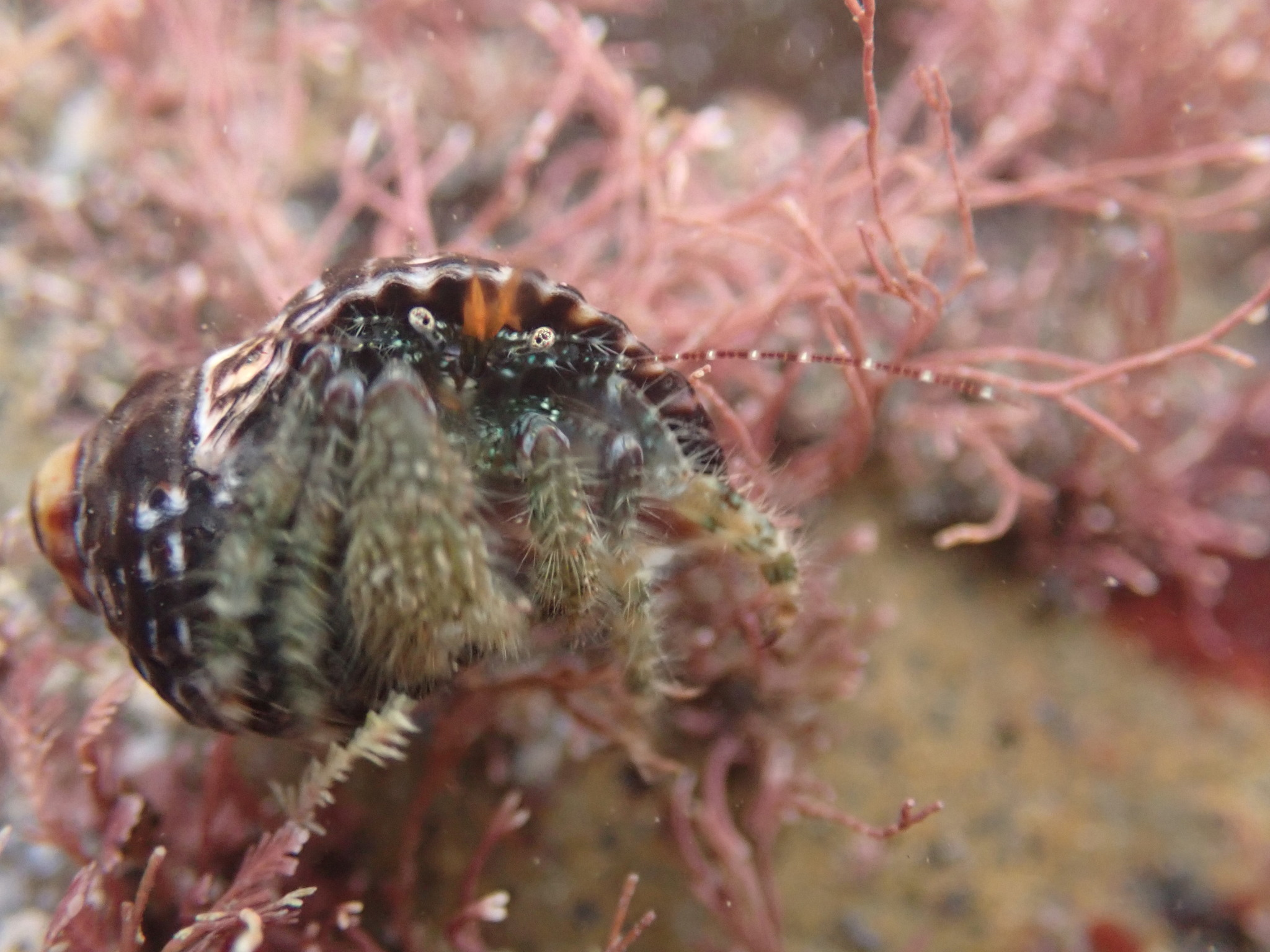

Scientific classification
- Kingdom: Animalia
- Phylum: Arthropoda
- Class: Malacostraca
- Order: Decapoda
- Suborder: Pleocyemata
- Infraorder: Anomura
- Family: Paguridae
- Genus: Pagurus
- Species: P. traversi

Binomial name
- Pagurus traversi (Filhol, 1885)

= Pagurus traversi =

Species of hermit crab

Pagurus traversi is a species of hermit crab. It was described in 1885.

== Description ==
Pagurus traversi is a small hermit crab native to New Zealand. It typically inhabits gastropod shells and displays reddish-brown coloration with tuberculate chelipeds. Individuals range up to 8.1 mm in carapace length and are often found in shallow rocky or sandy areas, including tide pools and the inner continental shelf. A small hermit-crab that lives in marine tide pools.

== Habitat ==
Pagurus traversi is native to New Zealand, particularly common along the southeastern coastlines such as the Otago and Kaikoura regions. It resides in intertidal zones and shallow waters, often in rocky habitats or among bryozoan tubes and polychaete shells.

== Behavior ==
Unlike most Pagurus species, P. traversi males do not exhibit the typical mating behavior during courtship. Instead, they use vibratory movements of their major cheliped during the early stages of mating, followed by shell grasping with their minor cheliped. This behavior is likely an adaptation to the lack of other Pagurus species in its area, reducing the need for species-specific courtship cues

== Growth and Molting ==
P. traversi is a fast-growing and short-lived species. Molting occurs more frequently at night when individuals are alone, but females in groups tend to molting more during the day. Molting frequency decreases as individuals grow larger. Carapace length increases by 22–29% in small individuals and as little as 2.9% in larger ones. Females have a median lifespan of about 0.4 years, while males live around 1.5 years
