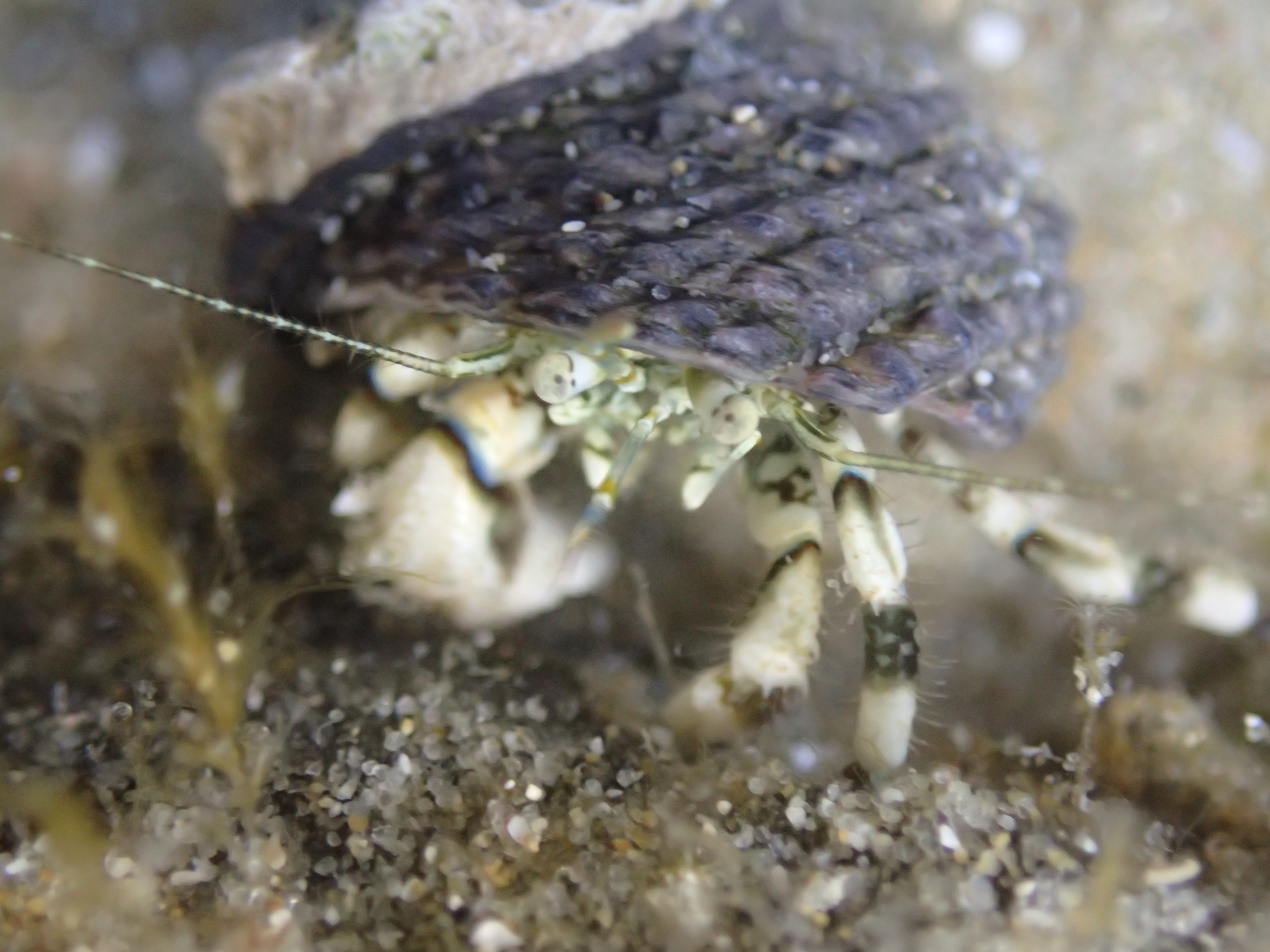

Scientific classification
- Kingdom: Animalia
- Phylum: Arthropoda
- Clade: Pancrustacea
- Class: Malacostraca
- Order: Decapoda
- Suborder: Pleocyemata
- Infraorder: Anomura
- Family: Paguridae
- Genus: Pagurus
- Species: P. novizealandiae

Binomial name
- Pagurus novizealandiae (Dana, 1852)

= Pagurus novizealandiae =

Species of crustacean

Pagurus novizealandiae, or the New Zealand hermit crab, is one of sixty species of hermit crab endemic to New Zealand.

== Description ==
Hermit crabs can be identified by the colouration of their antenna and their antennules (a small structure resembling antennae which sits in front of the actual antennae). The hermit crab is approximately the size of a coin and on average 56mm in length, but this is slightly limited by the size of the shells available. Its body is up to 16 millimetres (0.63 in) wide.

The crab's abdomen is spiral shaped, and can twist, so they can fit easily into the different shells they take on throughout their life. The crab protects itself from danger by contracting rapidly back into its shell. It uses its large chela as a door which protects it once it has retreated back into the safety of its shell. Throughout their lifetime hermit crabs adopt empty mollusk and gastropod shells to protect their soft and vulnerable abdomens. The crabs carry their shells around on their backs with small legs which are modified so that their back end can grip into the shell; they use their abdominal muscles to hold themselves securely in place. As hermit crabs grow they must switch shells to accommodate their expanding bodies.

== Distribution ==
Pagurus novizealandiae is widespread on the eastern coast of New Zealand, throughout both North and South Island. It is also found on the Auckland Islands 465 km south-east of New Zealand.

In Australia, the species has been reported in northern and eastern Tasmania from 2013, eastern Victoria, and southern New South Wales. Its identity was confirmed by specimens collected and examined at Museums Victoria. The New Zealand hermit crab is presumed translocated and established.

== Habitat ==
Pagurus novizealandiae is found in marine environments, around rocky intertidal shorelines or rocky sub tidal reefs. This species of hermit crab cannot tolerate a high dilution of seawater, and are generally restricted to areas such as the estuary where strong tidal activity takes place and the salinity of the water remains continuously high. The crab can be found at depths ranging from low tide to approximately 15m.

== Life cycle/phenology ==
Moulting is a vital part of the Pagurus novizealandiae life cycle in order to grow and develop, for the repair of any damaged limbs or other body parts on its abdomen and in the process of preparing for reproduction. Moulting has to occur so that the crab can mature, the hermit crab sheds its exoskeleton, while the crab is still inside of the small, enclosed space of its shell. Underneath is its new soft shell, it must wait until this has hardened so that it can protect its abdomen for when it leaves to find a new shell. The hardening and thickening process only takes a few days. After the moult this results in an increase in the hermit crabs size so it must find a larger shell to house its body. Their shells also just wear out naturally over time, are damaged by predators or become overgrown. During the searching process there is very high demand for shells as the crabs want to find a new home as quickly as they can so that they are safe from predators. Timing and location is a very important part in determining where to go to undergo the moulting procedure.

Both the male and female hermit crab produce inviting sex pheromones. The males are very aggressive during breeding and are known do be quite dominant over the females. The Pagurus novizealandiae's behaviours around the transfer of sperm will be unique to the species but the process will still involve lining up gonopores on the crab's legs and transferring the sperm from the male to female. In terms of egg laying, the female New Zealand hermit crab has two to three pleopods. These carry the fertilised eggs, which are covered in a glue like substance that helps them to stick onto her abdomen. The hermit crab protects the eggs inside of its shell out of dangers reach until the embryo development is fully complete. When the time has come for the eggs to be hatched and released the eggs let off a pheromone that stimulates the female, her movements help to hatch the eggs and they are delivered to the plankton. The larvae take weeks to months to grow, going through several different larval processes until they reach the final stages where they can occupy a small part of a broken snail shell. Eventually they become a juvenile hermit crab and start their hunt for a suitable shell.

== Diet and foraging ==
Hermit crabs are scavengers, they will forage during the night for dead or injured animals and feed off their remains. They can also be found moving about in rock pools during the day. They sometimes partially bury themselves into the sediment and feed on the organic matter, as well as algae, immobile invertebrates and filtered plankton and food particles. They are detritus feeders and eat a fairly broad and assorted diet. The hermit crab has one large powerful pincer/ claw and one small one. The large pincer is strong enough to rip apart the hard outer parts and armour on some of its prey such as tough fish scales, and skeletons so that it can access the soft fleshy parts within and break them into small enough pieces to eat. Its large pincer tends to remove the food then the smaller chela acts as a scoop which collects up the organic or animal material, which is then transported to the mouth with the crabs third maxillipeds (the outermost mouth parts, they hold the food until its ready to be pushed into the mouth). This is because often the larger pincer is too big to complete this process. Hermit crabs sometimes brace themselves over their prey using their walking legs to make it easier to rip pieces of flesh away from the animal. They are real scavengers in the sense that they will try and consume as much as they can in a short period of time before larger scavengers come along and steal their food from them.

== Predators, parasites and diseases ==
Because the hermit crab lives in the bottom of rock pools and ocean floors, and due to its size, its predator list is long. It is easy prey for the likes of fish, and octopus. Other crabs are also known to eat the smaller and more unprotected species, like the hermit crab, hence the need for shells to protect the soft body. Because the hermit crab "sifts" through the sediment at the bottom of the ocean, smaller invertebrates are known to utilize this as an opportunity for themselves.

== Shell trading ==
Hermit crabs display quite interesting behaviours during the shell trading process. The trade usually involves two crabs, they engage in a sort of physical fight probing, rocking and knocking each other's shells around. This type of behaviour gives the crabs the chance to check out the quality and size of one another's shells and actually usually results in both crabs benefitting from the trade. Large numbers of crabs can trade shells at once and it can take place in a very short period of time. Once they have traded it will not take the crab long to decide whether or not the shell is suitable.
