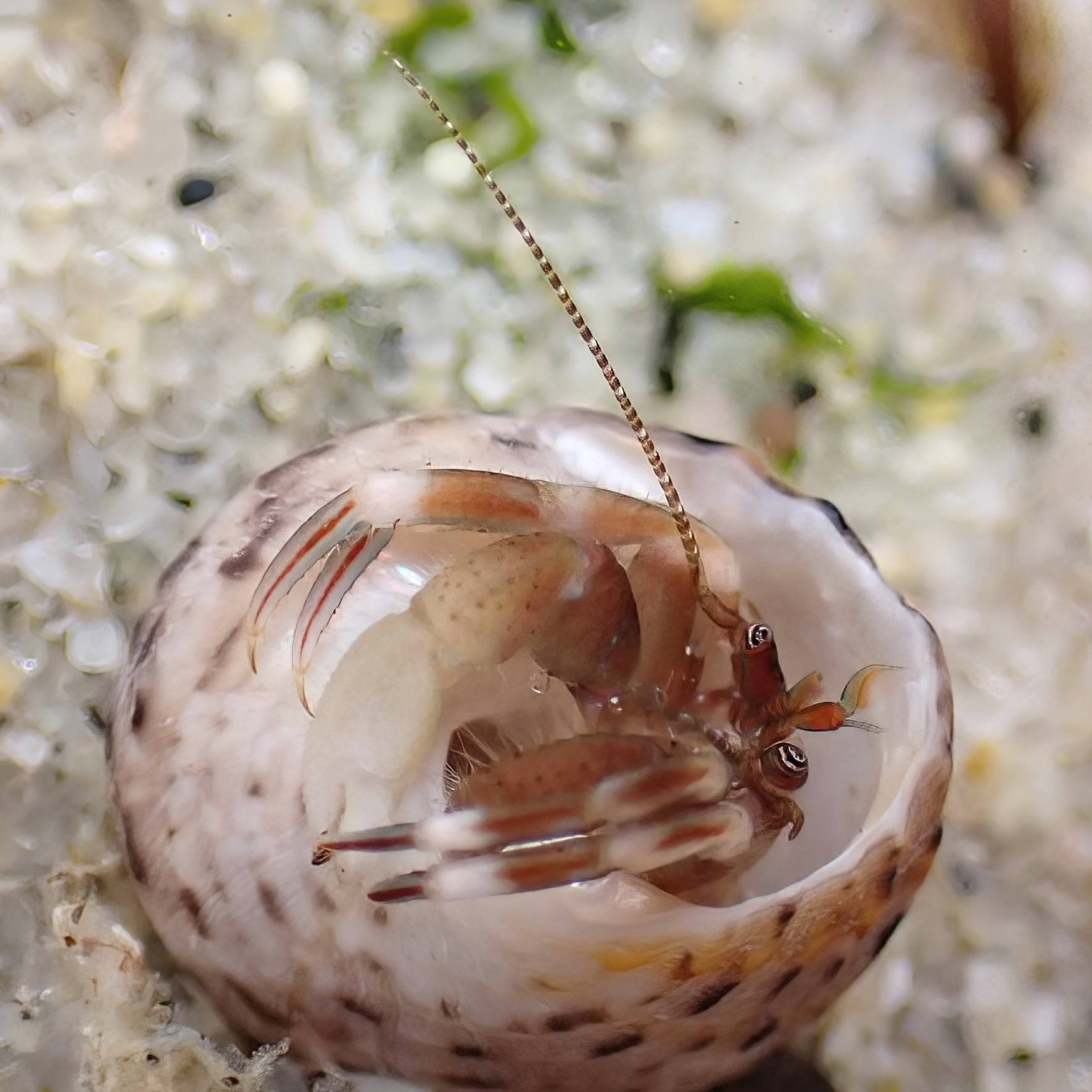

Scientific classification
- Kingdom: Animalia
- Phylum: Arthropoda
- Class: Malacostraca
- Order: Decapoda
- Suborder: Pleocyemata
- Infraorder: Anomura
- Family: Paguridae
- Genus: Pagurus
- Species: P. venturensis

Binomial name
- Pagurus venturensis Coffin, 1957

= Pagurus venturensis =

Marine crustacean

Pagurus venturensis, also known as the Ventura hermit crab, is a species of hermit crab found in the western Pacific Ocean along the coast of California and Baja California.
