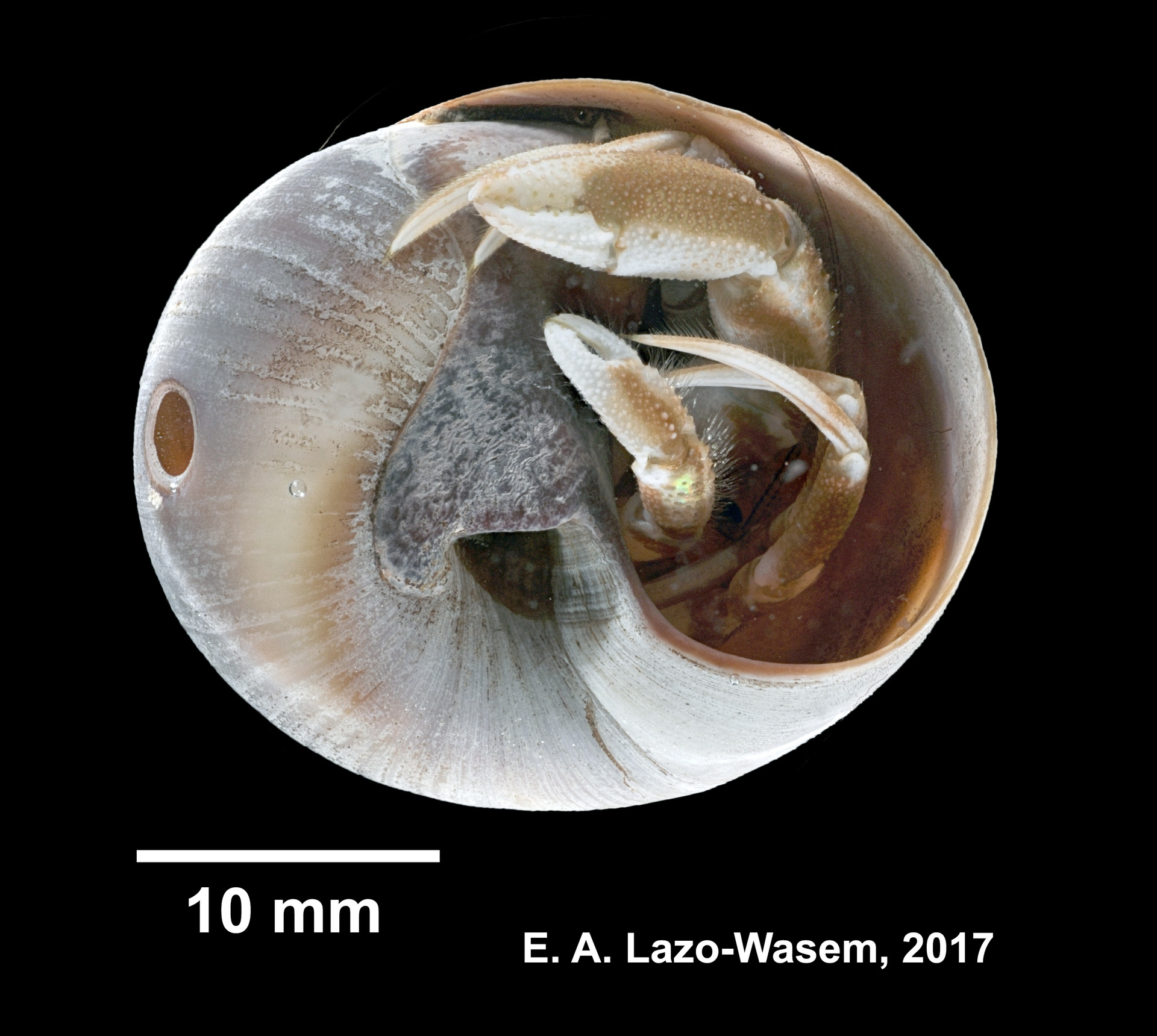

Scientific classification
- Kingdom: Animalia
- Phylum: Arthropoda
- Clade: Pancrustacea
- Class: Malacostraca
- Order: Decapoda
- Suborder: Pleocyemata
- Infraorder: Anomura
- Family: Paguridae
- Genus: Pagurus
- Species: P. longicarpus

Binomial name
- Pagurus longicarpus Say, 1817

= Pagurus longicarpus =

Species of crustacean

Pagurus longicarpus, the long-wristed hermit crab or the long-clawed hermit crab, is a common hermit crab found along the Atlantic and Gulf coasts of the United States and the Atlantic coast of Canada.

== Description ==
This species of hermit crab can reach a shell length of up to half an inch in size. P. longicarpus coloration can vary, but body color is most commonly gray, green or white. The right claw of P. longicarpus is much larger than the left, and each claw has a tan or gray stripe down the middle.

The long-wristed hermit crab inhabits the empty shells of gastropods such as periwinkles, snails, and oyster drills for mobile shelter and protection of their soft abdomens. They anchor themselves into the shells by wrapping their abdomens around the columella, or axis, inside the vacant shell. Hermit crabs cannot produce their own shells, and therefore must scavenge for abandoned ones. Shell selection plays many crucial roles in P. longicarpus, such as providing protection from predators, desiccation and salinity stress, as well as influencing competition, population size, and reproductive behaviors in the species.

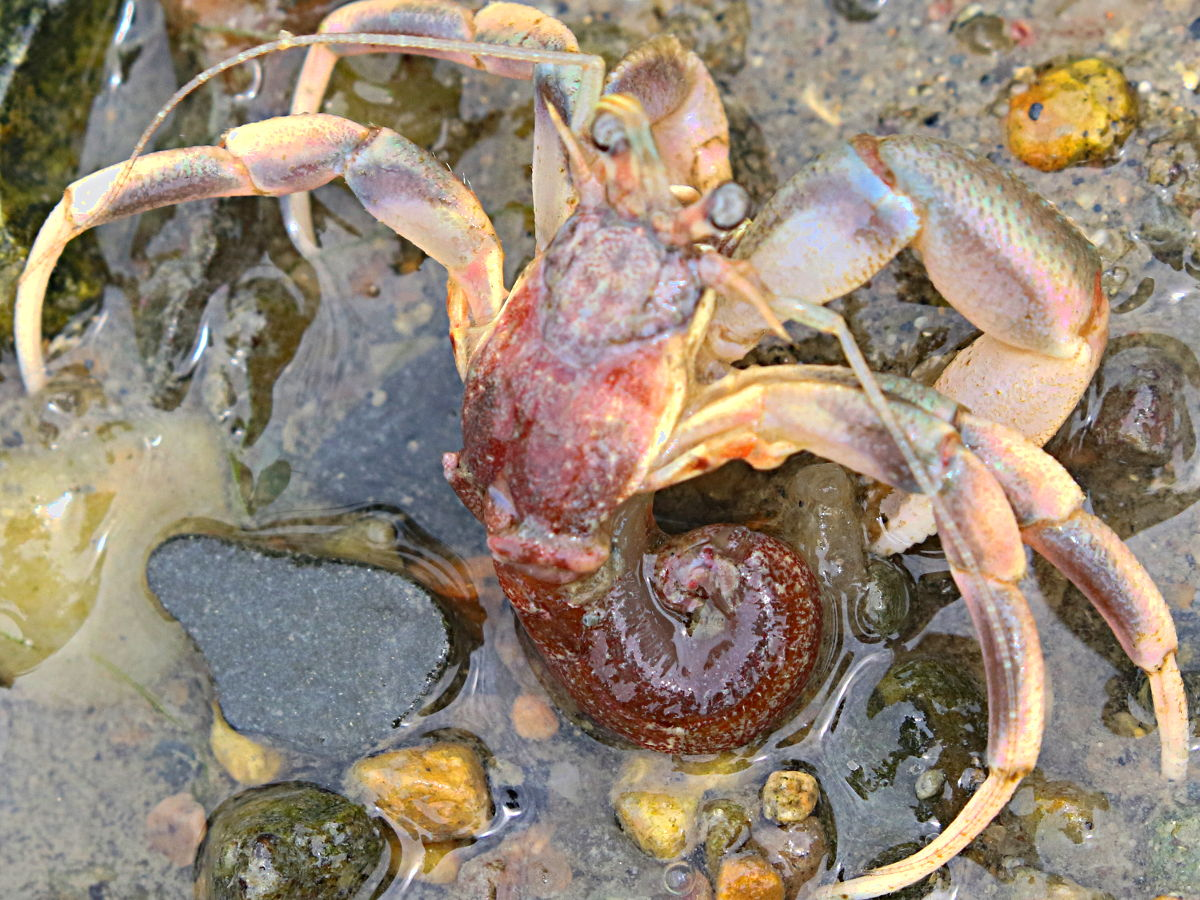
A crab out of a shell

== Distribution and habitat ==
Pagurus longicarpus is commonly found along the Atlantic coast of Canada and the United States, from Nova Scotia to Northeastern Florida, as well as along the Gulf coast of the United States to Texas. These hermit crabs can be found in intertidal and subtidal Atlantic environments on a variety of substrates and at depths of up to 200 meters. Most commonly, P. longicarpus is found in shallow tidal pools during the months of April to October, and in deeper and warmer waters during the fall and winter months. P. longicarpus faces extreme temperature and salinity fluctuations while inhabiting tidal pools due to the rising and falling tides, as well as changing climate. On hot, sunny days, there is often a rapid increase in tidal pool temperature and salinity, whereas on cooler, rainier days, salinity and temperature can rapidly decrease. Rising tides can also alter tidal pool conditions to those of the surrounding ocean. Due to these harsh living conditions, P. longicarpus depends heavily on its shell to cope with changing conditions. These fluctuating conditions can also impact shell selection in the species and determine species distribution within intertidal and subtidal regions.

According to Neumann, Knebelsberger, Barco and Haslob (2022), P. longicarpus has become established in the North Frisian Wadden Sea. This may have occurred due to trans-Atlantic transport of larvae in ballast water.

== Diet and predation ==
Long-wristed hermit crabs are scavenger feeders with a broad diet consisting of detritus, organic material found in ocean surface foam, microcrustaceans and algae. Feeding is performed by scooping sand or other substrate with the chelipeds, ripping and tearing food, and then passing it to the mouth for consumption.

The major predators of P. longicarpus include birds, fish, snails, octopuses and other crabs, including the green crab. Hermit crab shells are crucial for protection and minimizing predation, and therefore proper shell selection is vital. P. longicarpus will avoid selecting shells with extensive damage because they are more vulnerable to predation. The most common type of damage to hermit crab shells is the presence of small holes. These holes are caused by the drilling of nacticid gastropods in order to prey on the original gastropod hosts of the shell.

== Behavior ==
Intraspecific competition within this species is very common and is most often triggered by lack of resources. One of the most important limited resources to hermit crabs is their shell, which is key to their survival and reproductive success. Finding an appropriately sized shell is valuable for P. longicarpus. From an energetic standpoint, if a shell is too large, crabs will extend unnecessary energy carrying and maneuvering it. Alternatively, if the shell is too small, they could suffer from increased predation and desiccation. Shell selection also plays a role in reproductive success in P. longicarpus. Reproductive success is positively correlated with a larger shell size, and the rate of growth of the crabs can be stimulated by inhabiting larger shells. P. longicarpus also will not feed unless housed in the proper sized shell, ultimately leading to starvation and death. Each of the consequences of incorrect shell size places a strong selective pressure on obtaining the perfect shell, which often results in aggressive and competitive interactions within the species. In addition to fighting over mates and food, P. longicarpus will fight over shells. Larger crabs or crabs with less suitable shells will often forcibly remove other crabs with more desirable shells by clasping the chelae, or legs, of the occupant with its pincers, which allows them to take over the desired shell. Along with predation, shell availability is a major factor in determining P. longicarpus population size.

== Reproduction ==
P. longicarpus breeding season occurs from late March until October with the peak breeding in April. The main period of reproduction in the species occurs during the spring. Male hermit crabs will compete with other males for available females during breeding season. P. longicarpus, like many crustaceans, performs precopulatory mate-guarding behaviors, where males will grasp ahold of the female's shell once the female releases a pheromone signaling sexual maturity. Male and female crabs can be differentiated based on their pleopod morphology. Males have two pleopods, while females have three branching pleopods where her eggs are attached. P. longicarpus have sexual internal fertilization and must exit their shells in order to mate. After fertilization, the female houses the eggs inside her shell where they grow and develop. Larvae are later released into the surrounding ocean where they undergo several planktonic growth stages before developing into adult hermit crabs. The first is "zoea," the second is "megalops," and the third is "juvenile." After the larvae complete the juvenile stage, they become adult hermit crabs.
