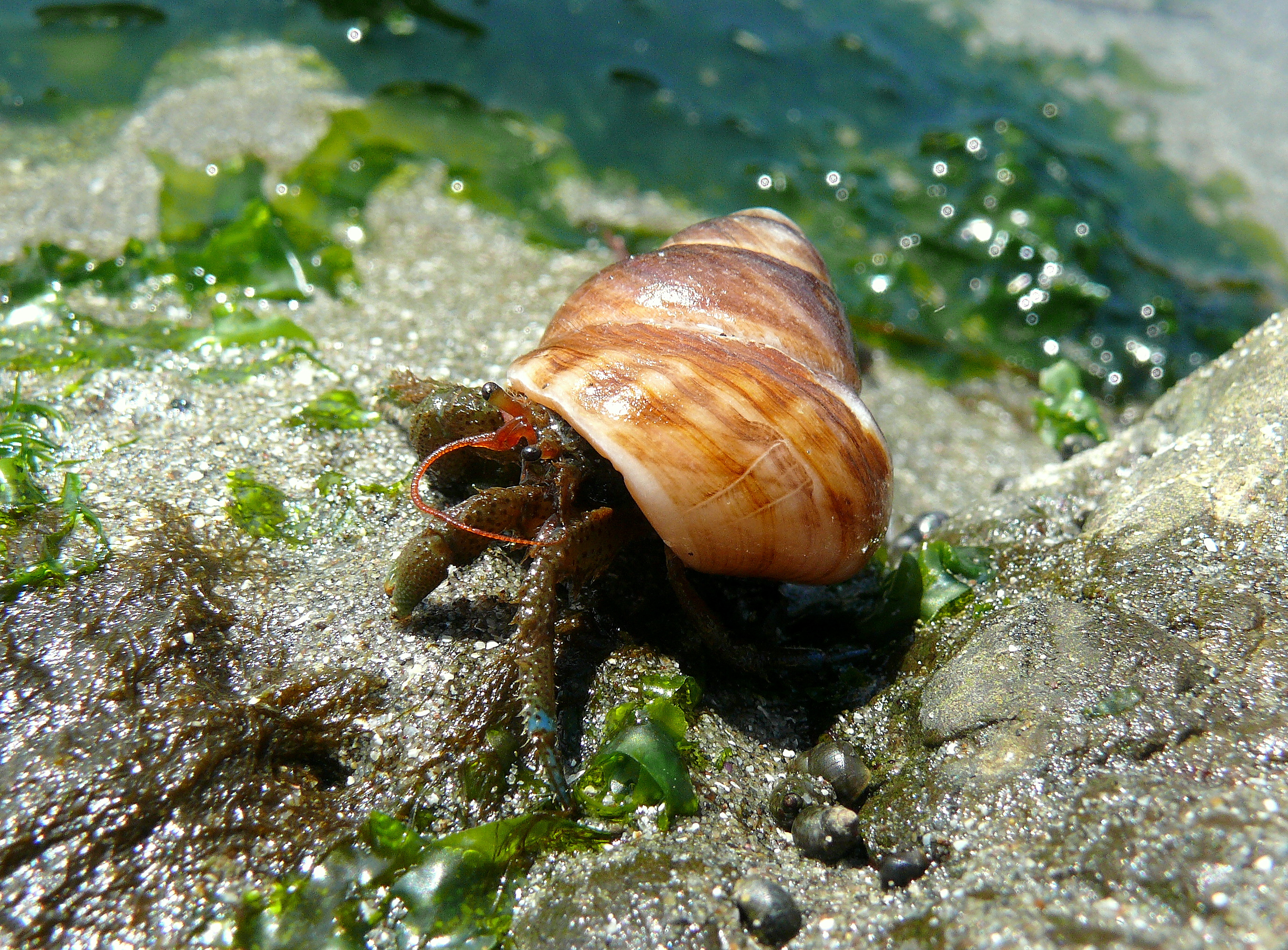
- Pagurus samuelis using a shell of Tegula brunnea

Scientific classification
- Domain: Eukaryota
- Kingdom: Animalia
- Phylum: Arthropoda
- Class: Malacostraca
- Order: Decapoda
- Suborder: Pleocyemata
- Infraorder: Anomura
- Family: Paguridae
- Genus: Pagurus
- Species: P. samuelis

Binomial name
- Pagurus samuelis (Stimpson, 1857)

Synonyms
- Eupagurus samuelis Stimpson, 1857

= Pagurus samuelis =

Species of crustacean

Pagurus samuelis, the blueband hermit crab, is a species of hermit crab from the west coast of North America, and the most common hermit crab in California. It is a small species, with distinctive blue bands on its legs. It prefers to live in the shell of the black turban snail, and is a nocturnal scavenger of algae and carrion.

== Description ==
Pagurus samuelis is a small hermit crab, at up to a total length of 40 mm (1.6 in) and a carapace width of up to 19 mm (0.75 in). The base colour of the exoskeleton is brown or green, but the antennae are red, and adults have bright blue bands near the tips of their legs. In smaller individuals, the bands may be white. The legs and carapace are covered in setae, and the rostrum at the front of the carapace is triangular.

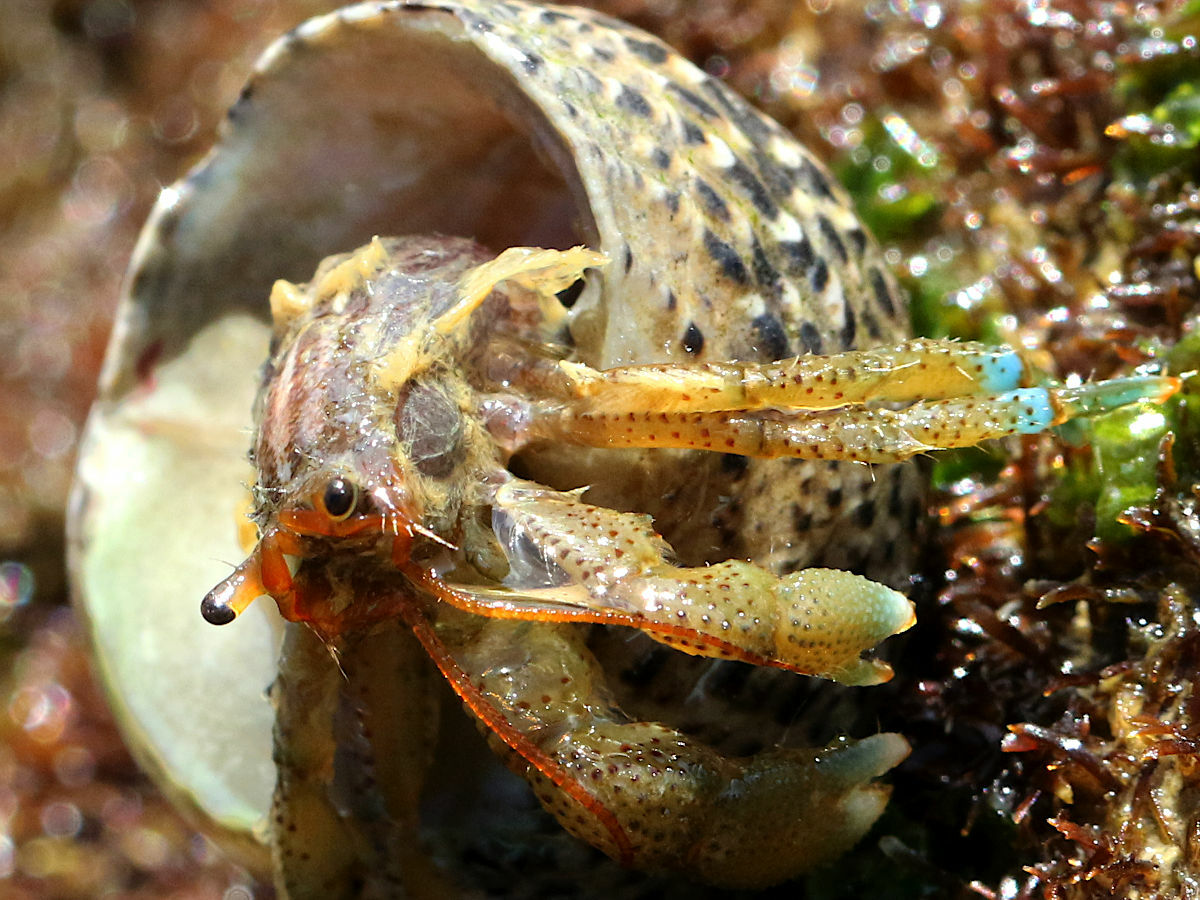
In a shell of Tegula eiseni

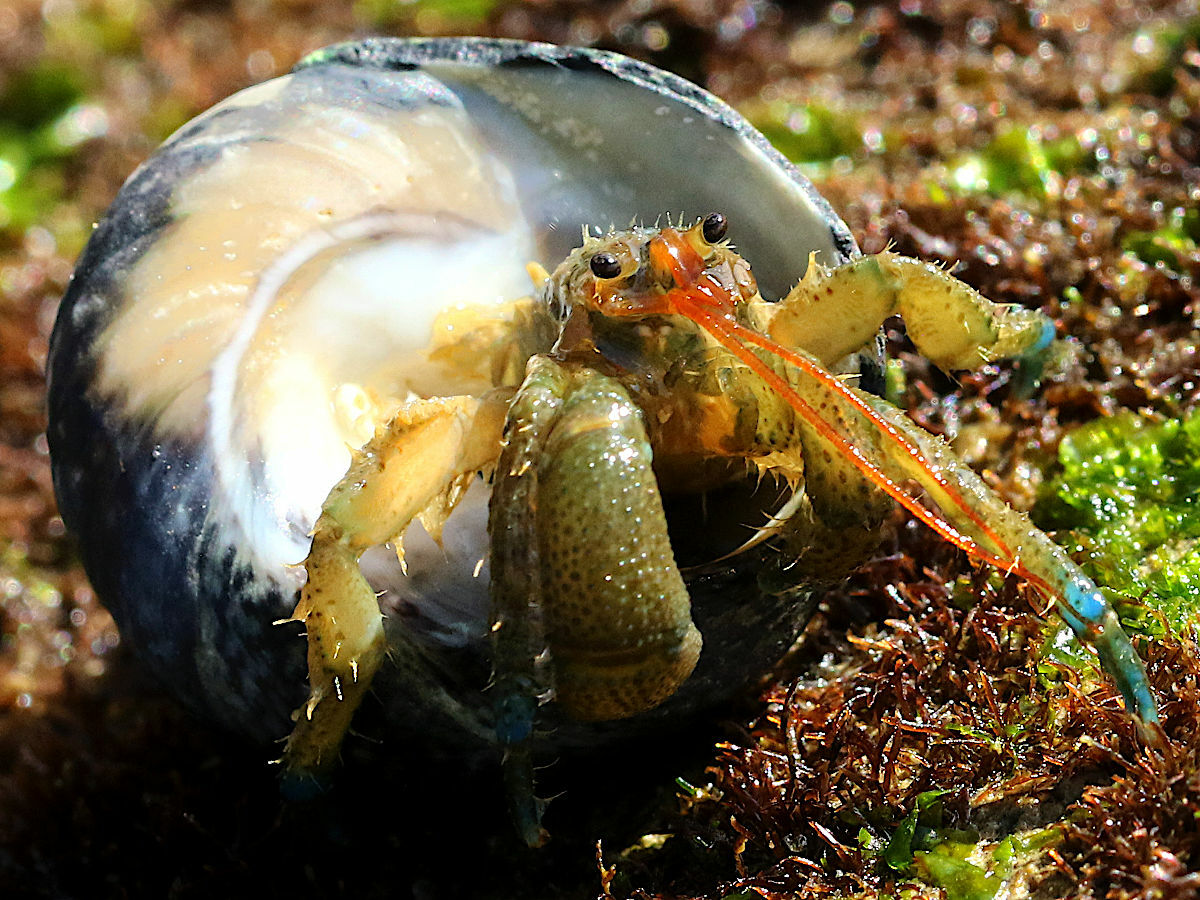
In a shell of Tegula gallina

== Distribution ==
Pagurus samuelis is found from Alaska to Punta Eugenia in Baja California, Mexico. It was formerly thought to also occur in Japan, but the Japanese specimens which were formerly assigned to this species are now recognised as Pagurus filholi.

== Ecology and life cycle ==
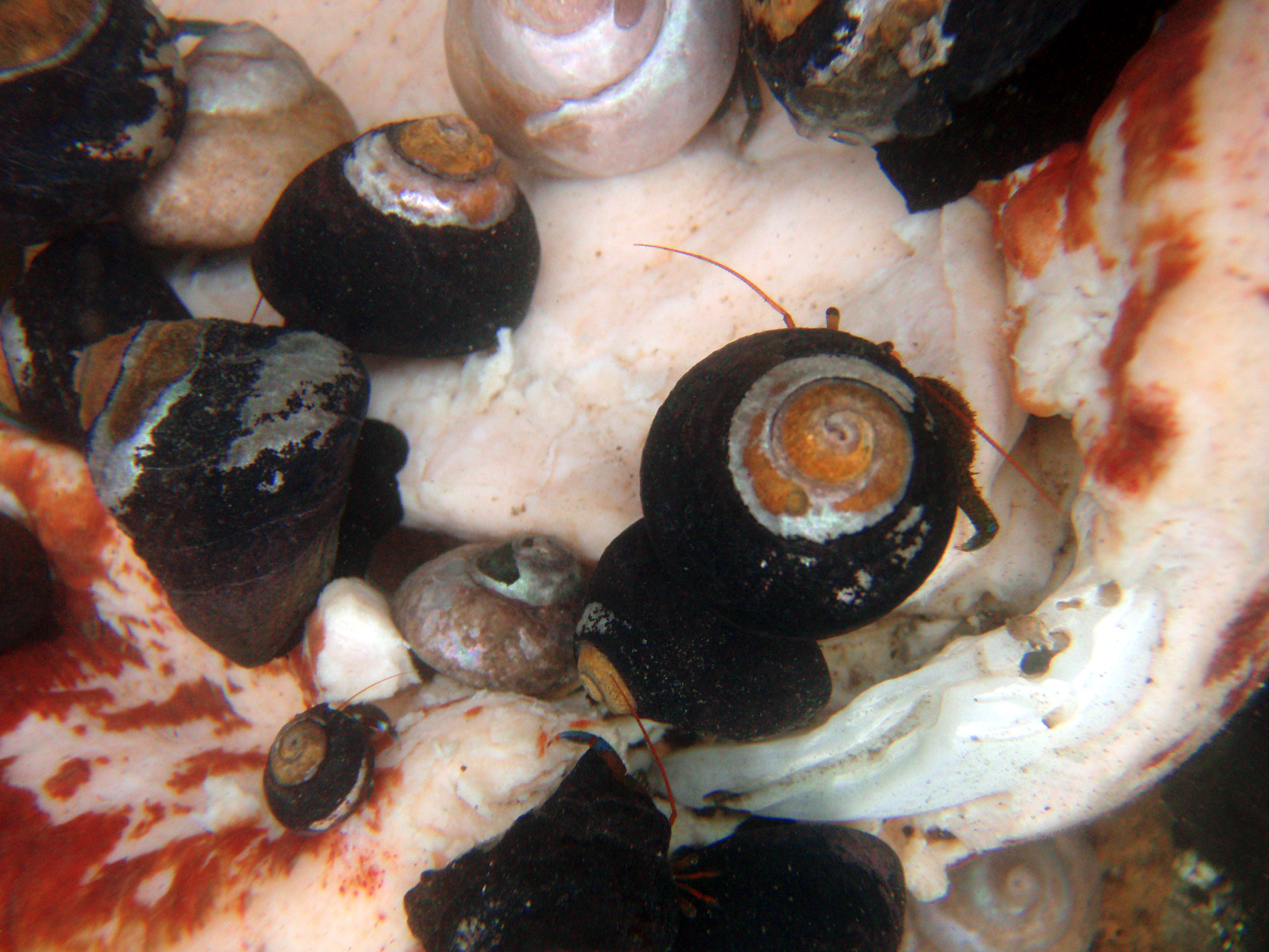
Pagurus samuelis and live Tegula funebralis feeding on a dead gumboot chiton

Pagurus samuelis prefers to use the discarded shell of the black turban snail, Tegula funebralis. They are chiefly nocturnal scavengers that feed on algae, especially the giant kelp Macrocystis pyrifera, and detritus. In a laboratory setting, P. samuelis can survive on a diet of Pelvetia canaliculata. Predators of P. samuelis include fishes such as the pile perch (Rhacochilus vacca), California sheephead (Semicossyphus pulcher) and the spotted kelpfish, Gibbonsia elegans.

In the breeding season, males carry females on their backs, sometimes for more than a day. Eggs are produced from May to July, and are carried on the female's abdomen, inside the shell.

== See also ==
- Pagurus hirsutiusculus
