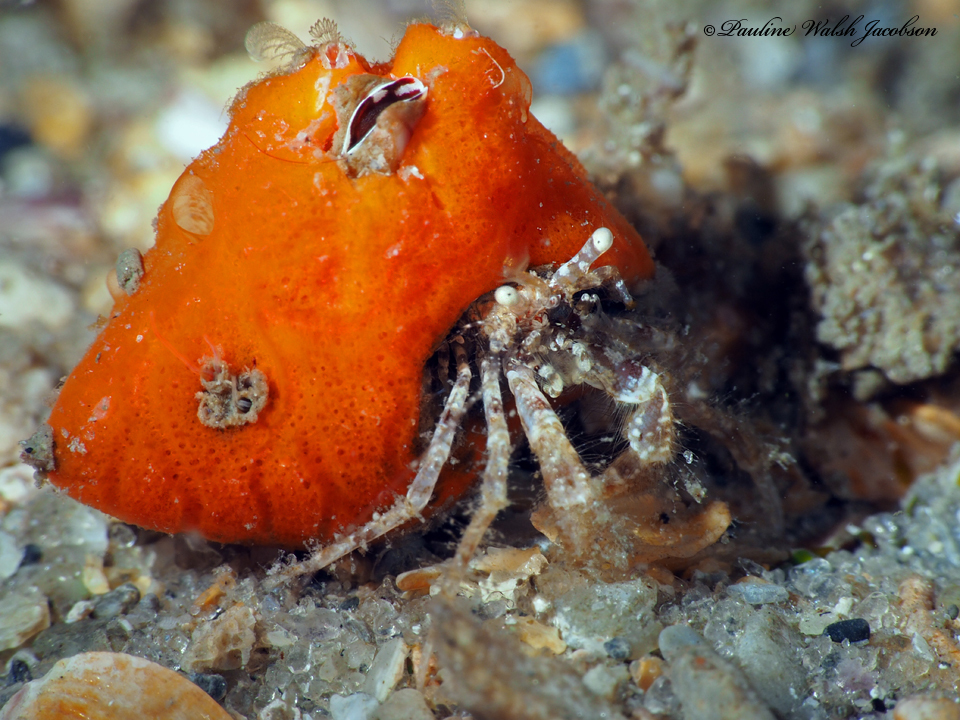

Scientific classification
- Kingdom: Animalia
- Phylum: Arthropoda
- Clade: Pancrustacea
- Class: Malacostraca
- Order: Decapoda
- Suborder: Pleocyemata
- Infraorder: Anomura
- Family: Paguridae
- Genus: Pagurus
- Species: P. maclaughlinae

Binomial name
- Pagurus maclaughlinae García-Gómez, 1982

= Pagurus maclaughlinae =

Species of hermit crab

Pagurus maclaughlinae is a species of hermit crab within the family Paguridae found throughout the Gulf of Mexico, Eastern Florida, and the Caribbean Sea.

== Description ==
Pagurus maclaughlinae is a relatively small hermit crab that typically has a shield length not exceeding 3 mm. The coloration of the body is brown with white spots. The chelipeds, maxillipeds, and pereopods of the hermit crab have white and brown banding.

== Distribution and habitat ==
Pagurus maclaughlinae is found throughout the Gulf of Mexico, Eastern Florida, and the Caribbean Sea, preferring warm-temperate climates. The hermit crab lives in shallow coastal waters, including brackish habitats.
