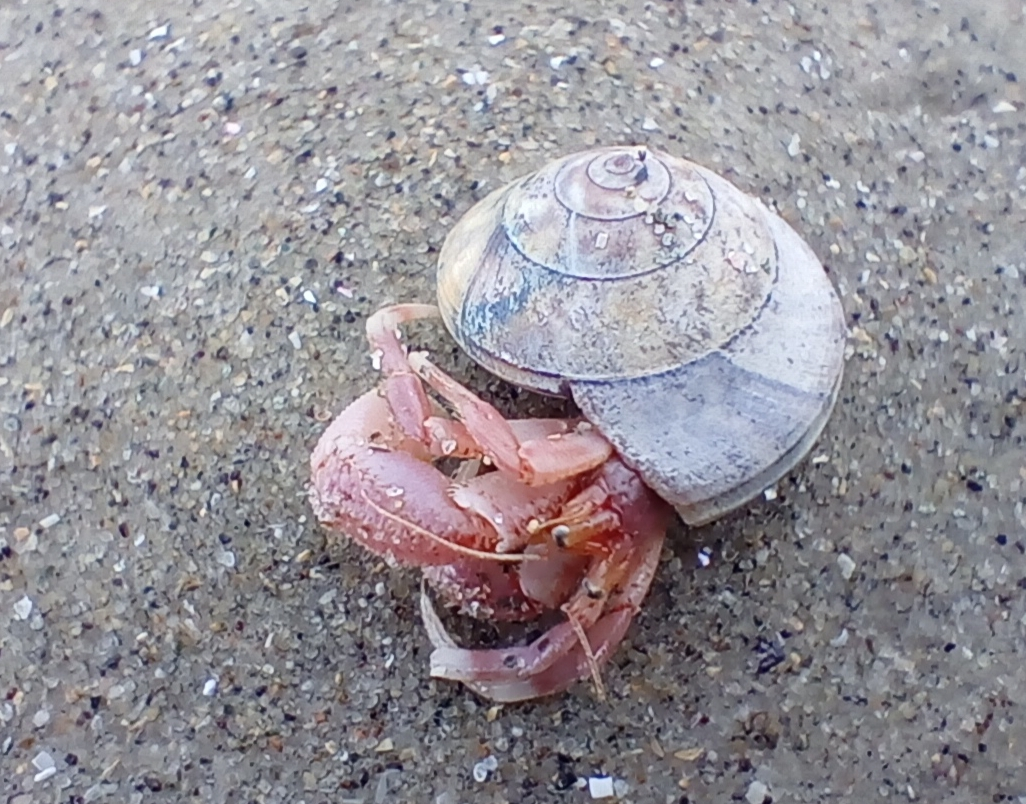

Scientific classification
- Domain: Eukaryota
- Kingdom: Animalia
- Phylum: Arthropoda
- Class: Malacostraca
- Order: Decapoda
- Suborder: Pleocyemata
- Infraorder: Anomura
- Family: Paguridae
- Genus: Pagurus
- Species: P. albidianthus

Binomial name
- Pagurus albidianthus de Saint Laurent & McLaughlin, 2000

= Pagurus albidianthus =

Species of hermit crab

Pagurus albidianthus is a species of hermit crab found in New Zealand.
