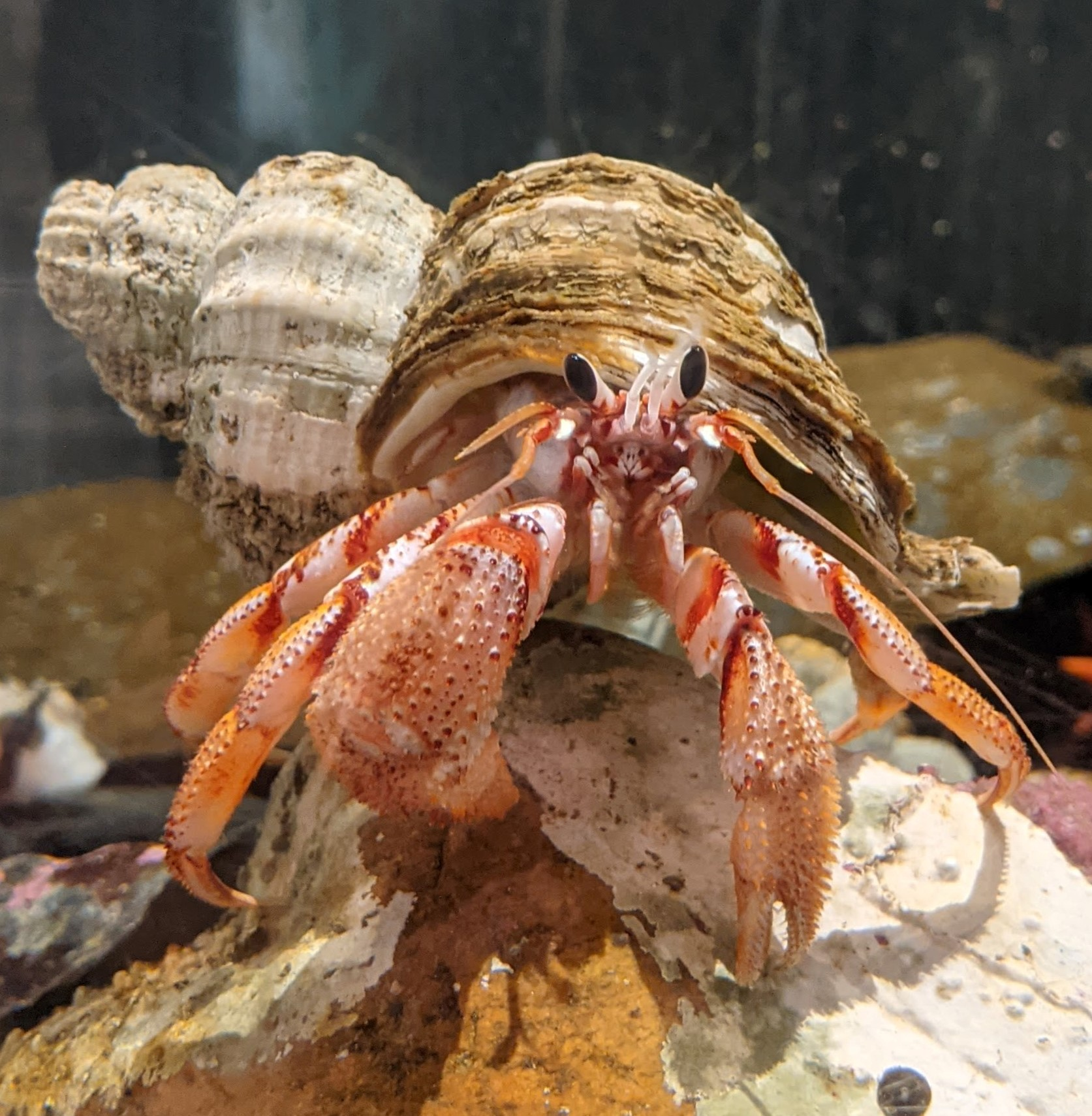

Scientific classification
- Domain: Eukaryota
- Kingdom: Animalia
- Phylum: Arthropoda
- Class: Malacostraca
- Order: Decapoda
- Suborder: Pleocyemata
- Infraorder: Anomura
- Family: Paguridae
- Genus: Pagurus
- Species: P. armatus

Binomial name
- Pagurus armatus (Dana, 1851)

Synonyms
- Bernhardus armatus Dana, 1851

= Pagurus armatus =

Species of crustacean

Pagurus armatus, the armed hermit crab or black-eyed hermit crab, is a species of hermit crab found in the eastern Pacific Ocean of the United States and British Columbia, Canada.

== Description ==
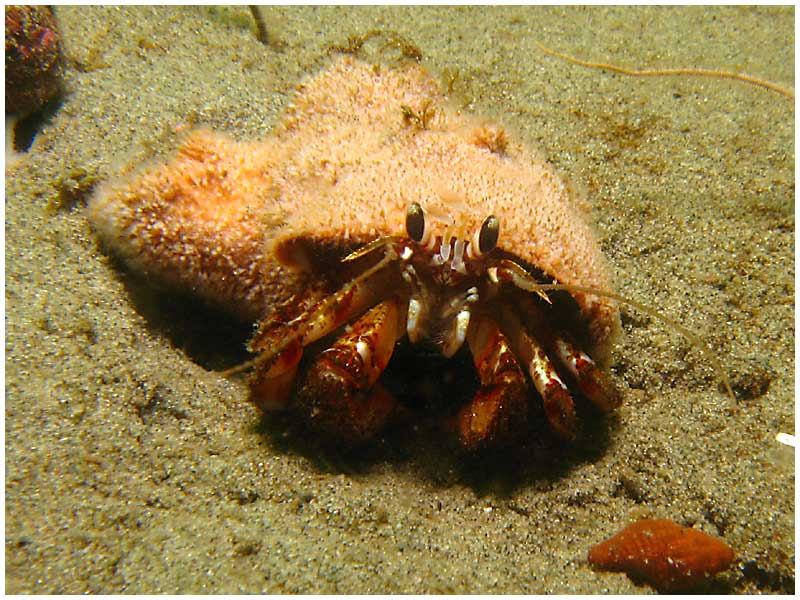

P. armatus is one of the largest species of hermit crab: adults may reach a carapace length of 43 mm (1.7 in). The legs, including the claws, have bands of colour, in red, orange and white, and the claws bear short spines on the dorsal surface. The eyestalks are short, but bear large black compound eyes. P. armatus can be told apart from the similar P. ochotensis by the spines on its claws, which in P. ochotensis are replaced by granules. The two species are so similar that they have sometimes been considered members of the same species, but are now generally thought to be two distinct species.

== Ecology ==
P. armatus lives on a variety of substrates, being particularly abundant in sea pen beds, at depths of up to 117 m (384 ft)

== Type specimen ==
P. armatus was originally described (under the name Bernhardus armatus) from Puget Sound by James Dwight Dana. The holotype of P. armatus was lost in the Great Chicago Fire of 1871, and has been replaced with a lectotype.
