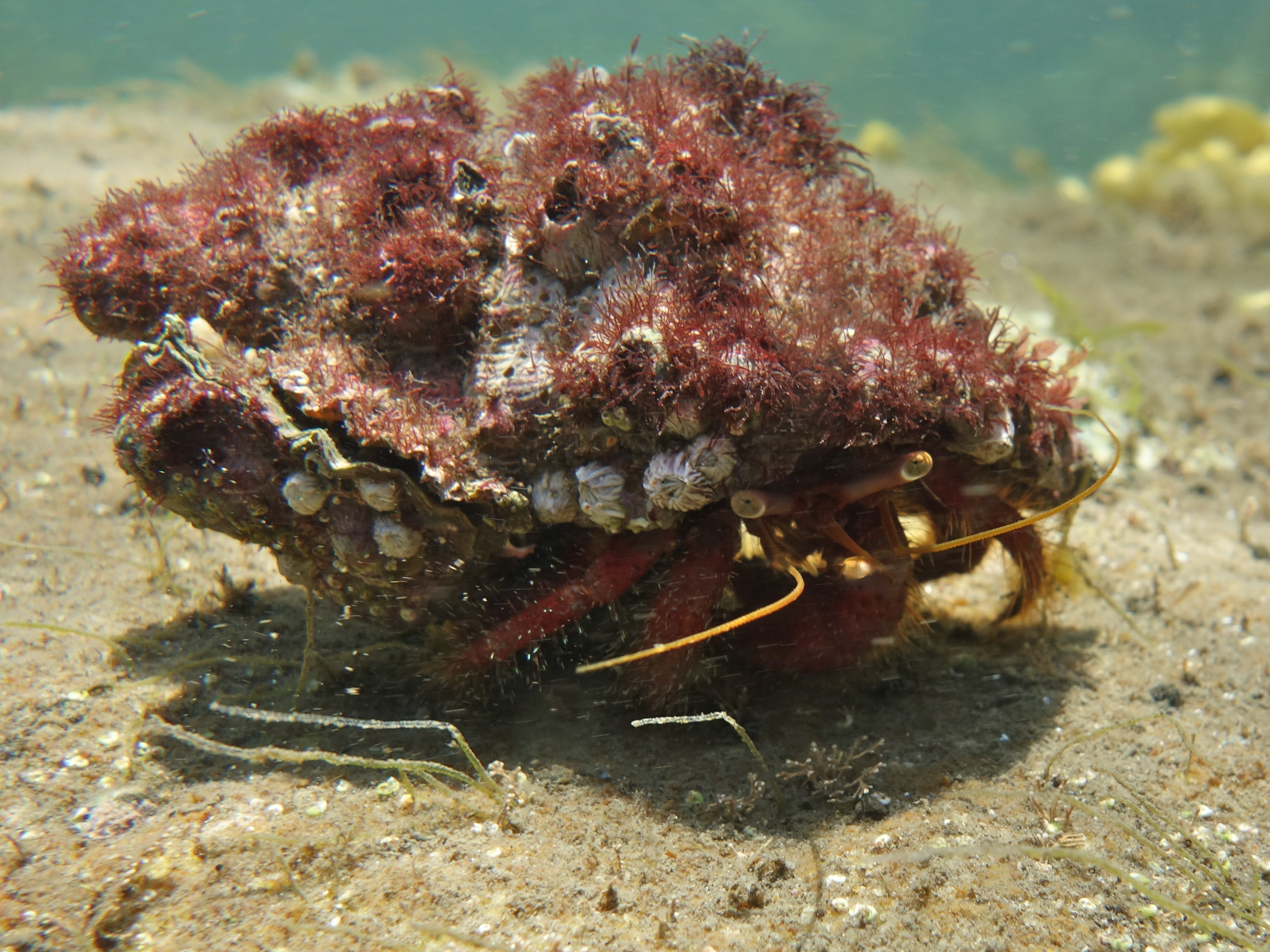

Scientific classification
- Domain: Eukaryota
- Kingdom: Animalia
- Phylum: Arthropoda
- Class: Malacostraca
- Order: Decapoda
- Suborder: Pleocyemata
- Infraorder: Anomura
- Family: Paguridae
- Genus: Pagurus
- Species: P. sinuatus

Binomial name
- Pagurus sinuatus (Stimpson, 1858)

Synonyms
- Eupagurus sinuatus Stimpson, 1858

= Pagurus sinuatus =

Species of crustacean

Pagurus sinuatus is a large species of hermit crab found in Australia and the Kermadec Islands. It is red or orange in colour with coloured bands on the legs and patches on the body.

== Description ==
Pagurus sinuatus is a large species of hermit crab, and normally inhabits rounded gastropod shells. It is distinguished from other hermit crab species in Australia by its solid, hairy chelipeds (claw-bearing appendages), although there may be further undescribed species within its range. The hermit crab's body is orange and red, with patches of red or violet colour. The pereiopods (walking legs) are banded. It reaches a maximum "shield length" (distance from the rostrum to the cervical groove on the carapace) of 14.5 millimetres (0.57 in).

== Distribution ==
Pagurus sinuatus is found in the intertidal zone along the coasts of the Australian states of New South Wales, South Australia, Victoria and Western Australia, and in the Kermadec Islands (New Zealand).
