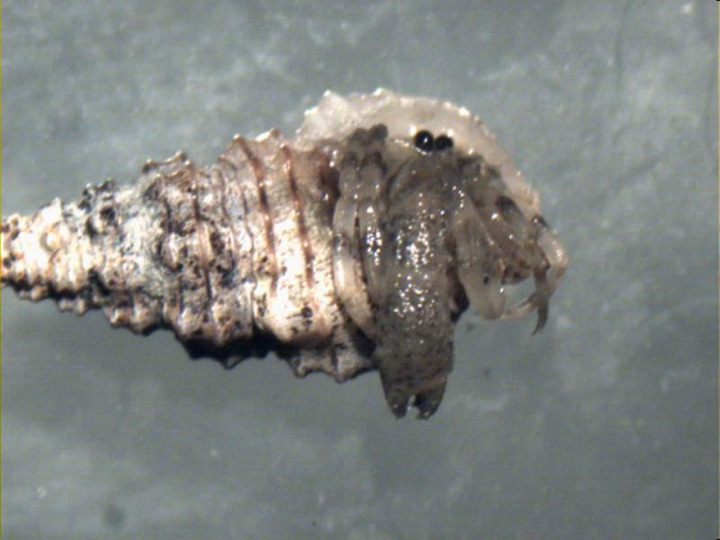

Scientific classification
- Domain: Eukaryota
- Kingdom: Animalia
- Phylum: Arthropoda
- Class: Malacostraca
- Order: Decapoda
- Suborder: Pleocyemata
- Infraorder: Anomura
- Family: Paguridae
- Genus: Pagurus
- Species: P. annulipes

Binomial name
- Pagurus annulipes (Stimpson, 1860)

Synonyms
- Eupagurus annulipes Stimpson, 1860

= Pagurus annulipes =

Species of crab

Pagurus annulipes, the brown banded hermit, is a species of hermit crab in the family Paguridae. It is found in the western Atlantic Ocean. It is the only hermit crab with banded legs on the coast of the NE United States.
