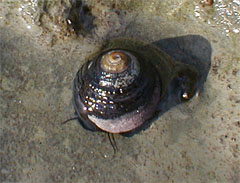
- In Santa Cruz, California
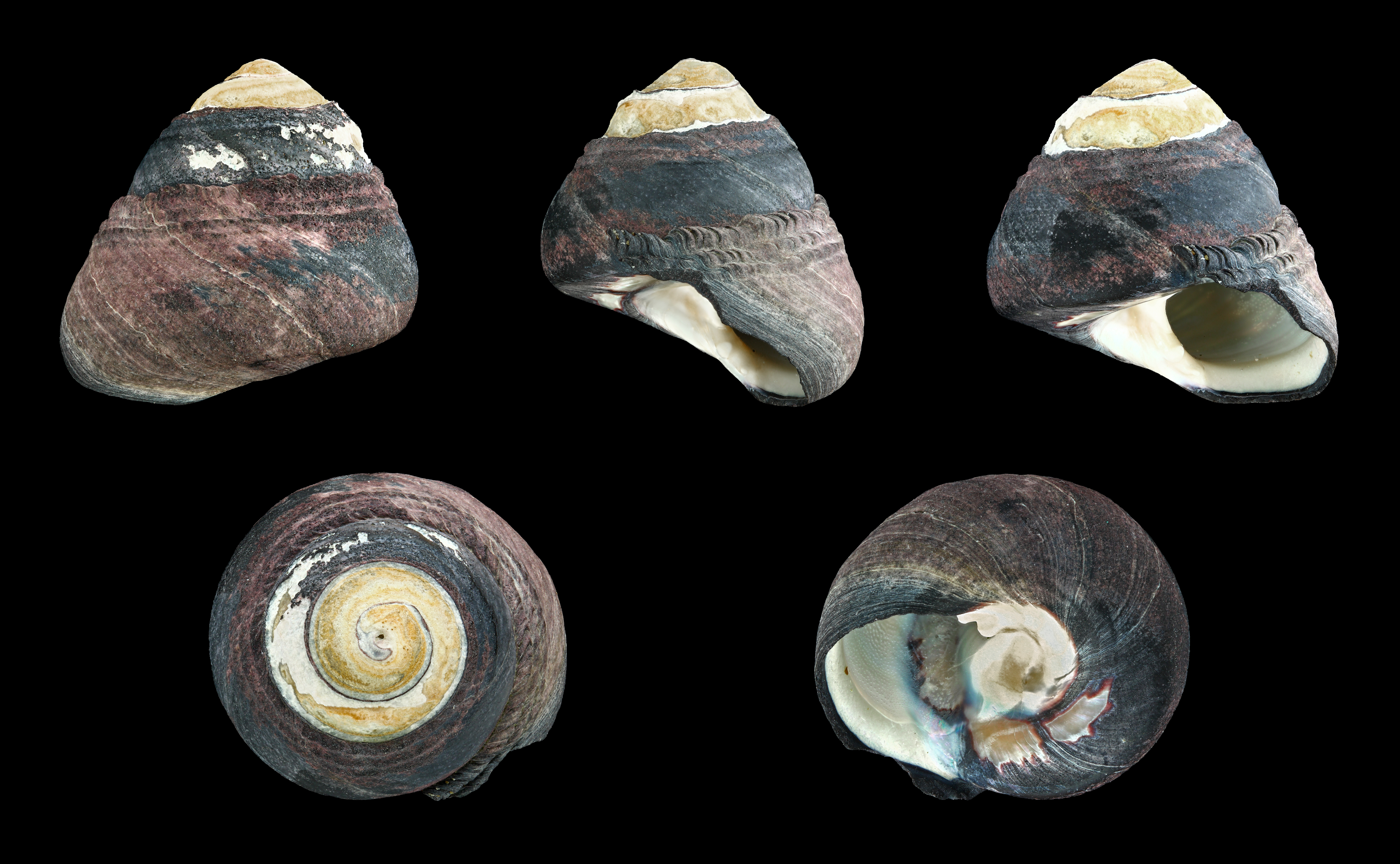
- Five views of a shell

Scientific classification
- Kingdom: Animalia
- Phylum: Mollusca
- Class: Gastropoda
- Subclass: Vetigastropoda
- Order: Trochida
- Family: Tegulidae
- Genus: Tegula
- Species: T. funebralis

Binomial name
- Tegula funebralis (A. Adams, 1855)

Synonyms
- Chlorostoma funebrale A. Adams, 1855 (original combination); Chlorostoma funebralis (A. Adams, 1855); Trochus funebralis Fischer

= Tegula funebralis =

Species of black marine sea snail of the family Tegulidae

Tegula funebralis, the black turban snail or black tegula, is a species of medium-sized marine sea snail in the family Tegulidae. This eastern Pacific Ocean species was previously known as Chlorostoma funebralis.

== Description ==
Most adults have shells which are 20 to 50 mm (or about an inch, to an inch and three quarters) in diameter. Adults weigh anywhere from 2 to 20 grams. Individuals can live anywhere from 7 to 30 years; studies have shown that individuals inhabiting the more northern portions of the organism's range are larger and live longer on average than organisms inhabiting the southern portions.

In 1971, a new sense organ was discovered in this marine snail. Chemoreceptor organs were found near the base on the border of the leaflets of the ctenidium (comb-like respiratory gills), one on each leaflet. They form a light swelling near the base of the leaflet with a pocket lying within the swelling. Together they are termed a "bursicle".

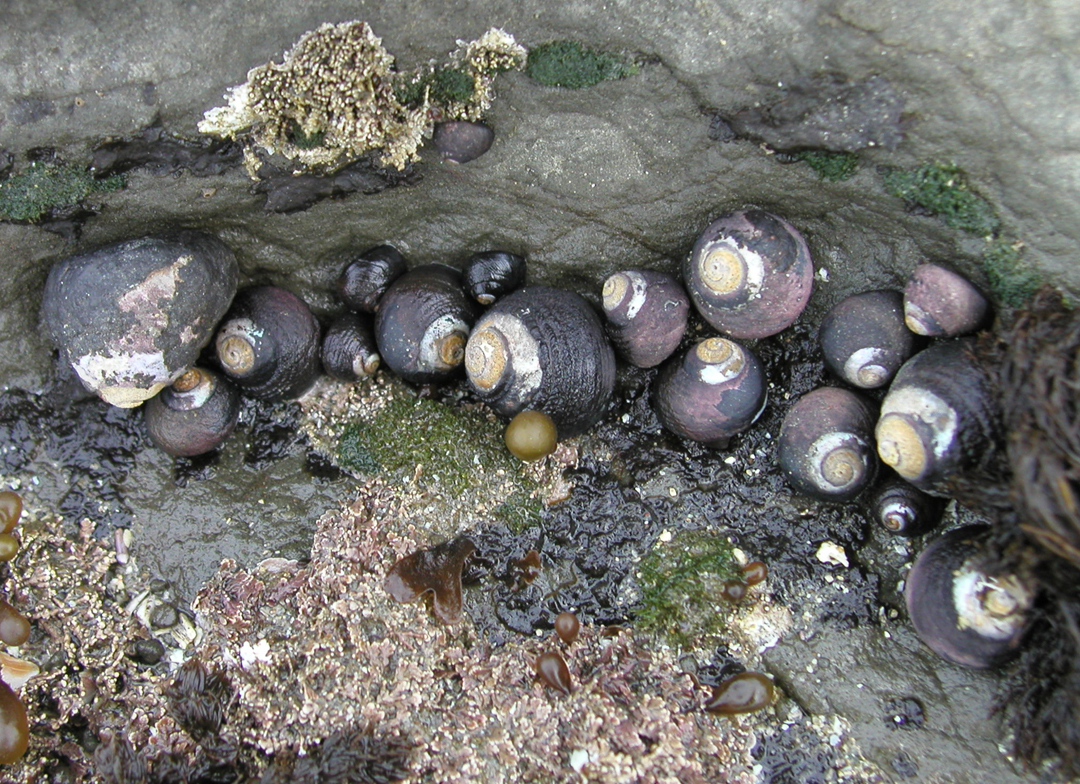
Black turban snails living in a rocky intertidal zone

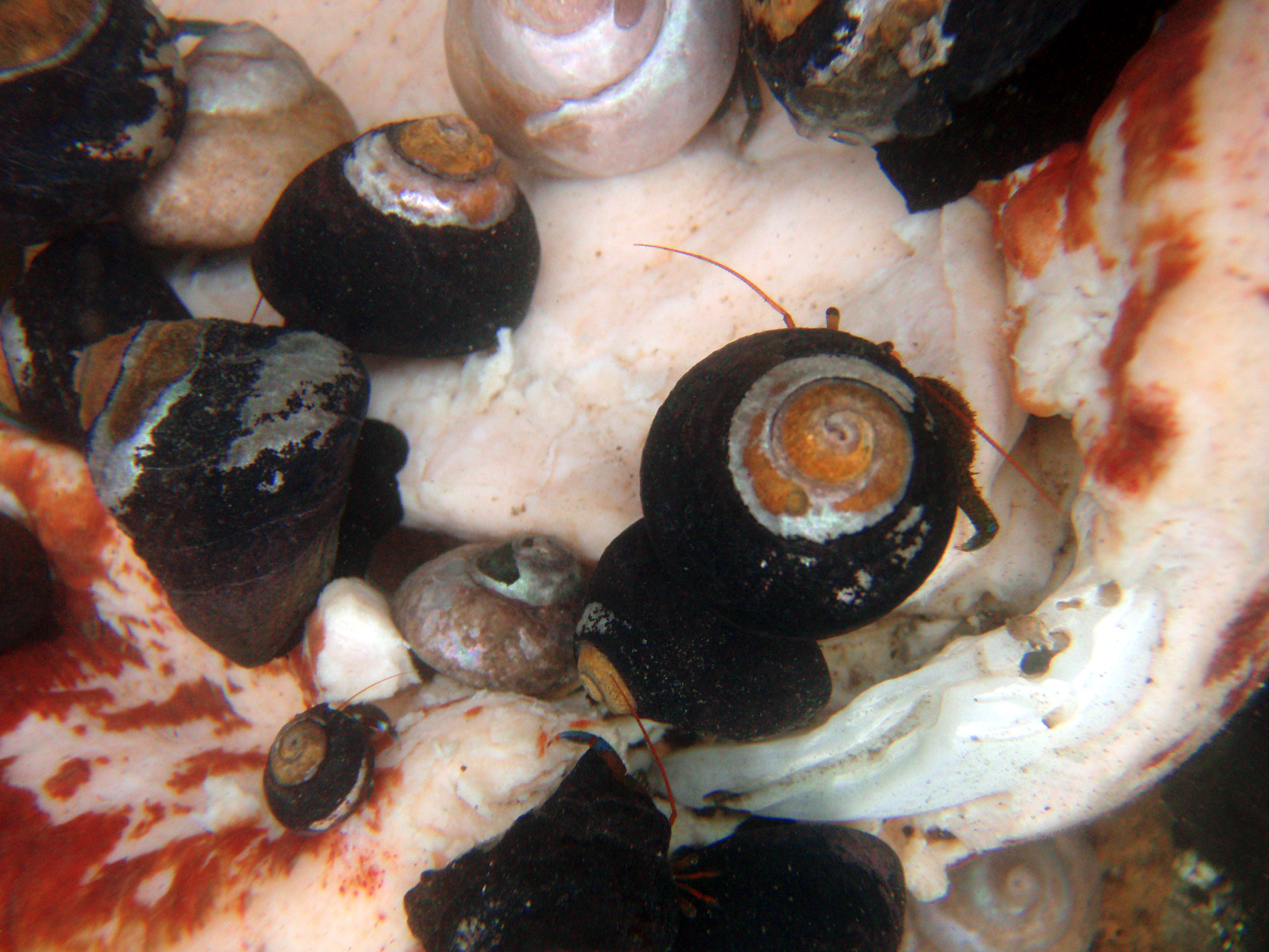
Black turban snails and hermit crabs on a dead gumboot chiton in a tide pool in central California

== Distribution and habitat ==
Black turban snails are found along the Pacific coast of North America from British Columbia to Baja California, where they are one of the most abundant snail species. Studies have recorded densities of up to 1,400 individuals per m^{2} near Monterey, California. Local densities are influenced by many factors, including abundance of food, predators, and suitable habitat.

This species inhabits rocky intertidal zones, between low and high tide lines. Juveniles are found mostly under rocks and among coarse sands. Empty black turban snail shells are often utilized by another common intertidal animal, the hermit crab.

== Diet ==
Tegula funebralis is primarily herbivorous. Food for T. funebralis can be categorized as either rock encrusting algae, macroscopic algae, or organic detritus. Studies into the macroscopic algal preferences of T. funebralis revealed a strong preference for Nereocystis luetkana and Macrocystis integrifolia. Macroscopic algae species preferred by T. funebralis are similar in that they are non-calcareous, non-filamentous, and softer in comparison to other macroscopic algae in the region. These species do not grow in the intertidal, so they are only available to T. funebralis as drift material.

== Threats ==
Predators of T. funebralis include sea stars, crabs, octopuses, sea gulls, and sea otters. Experiments showed that T. funebralis will flee if it detects a predator nearby, and if already in motion, can increase its speed from 2–3 cm per minute to around 8 cm per minute. If the anterior portion of T. funebralis is touched by a predator, it can raise the front of the foot and make a 90° turn to escape. Additionally, if T. funebralis detects a predator while on a steep surface, it can detach itself and roll down the incline.

== Human use ==
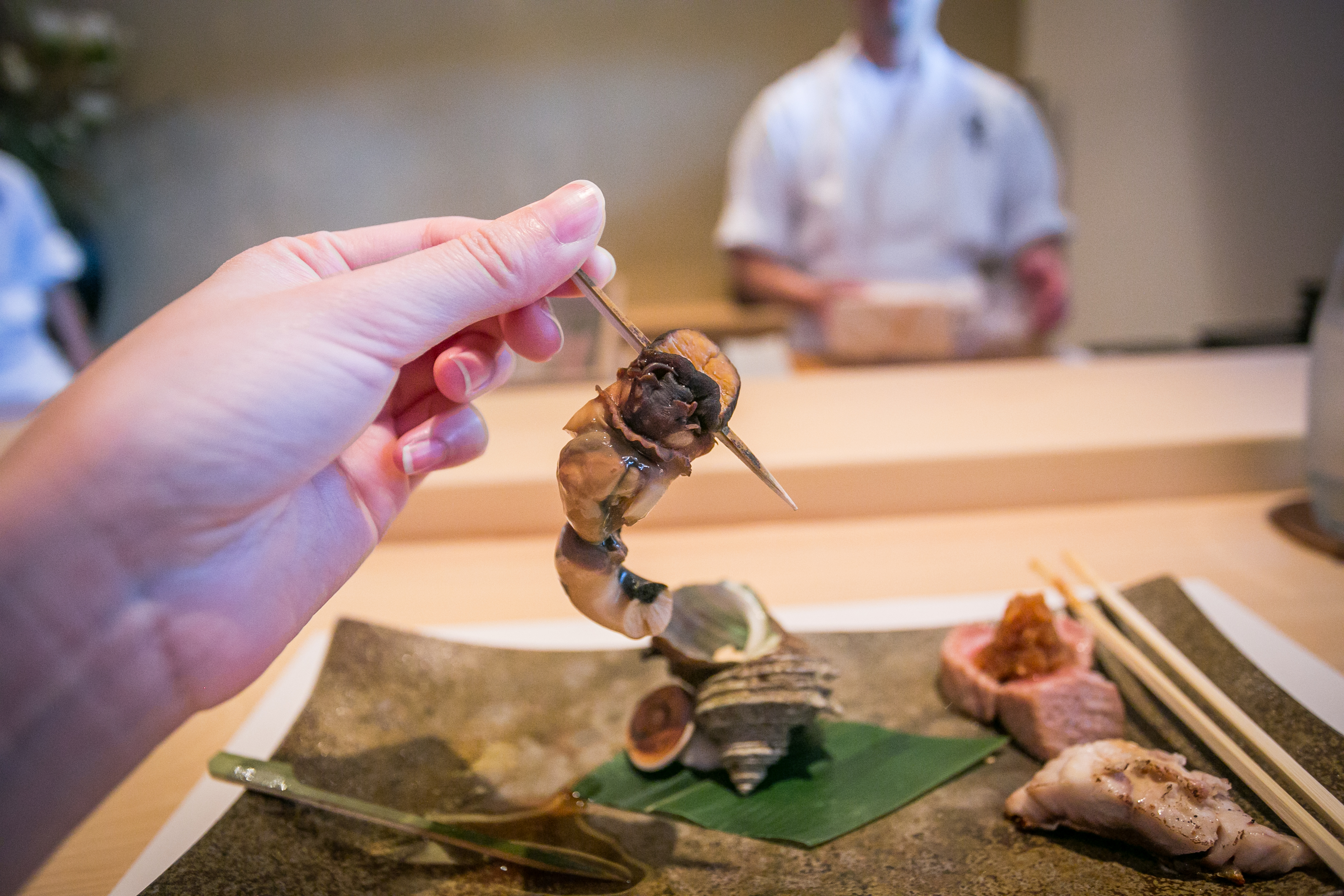
Princess Turban Snail sushi at Kabuto in Las Vegas

Archaeological evidence shows that humans have utilized black turban snails for over 12,000 years. The edible portion of the snail can range in weight from less than a gram to 8 grams. It is estimated that the average human would need to consume around 400 snails a day to meet their minimum caloric needs if it were the only food consumed.

Evidence for human consumption of black turban snails includes the discovery of shell middens in association with tools referred to by researchers as "turban crackers". Evidence from several late Holocene middens suggest that harvesting increased around 3,000 years ago. The analysis of middens found near Point Conception reveal that black turban snails comprised up to 60% of meat yields for the native people in that area. Researchers speculate that the prevalence of eating these snails was probably influenced by the abundance of individuals and the ease of collection.
