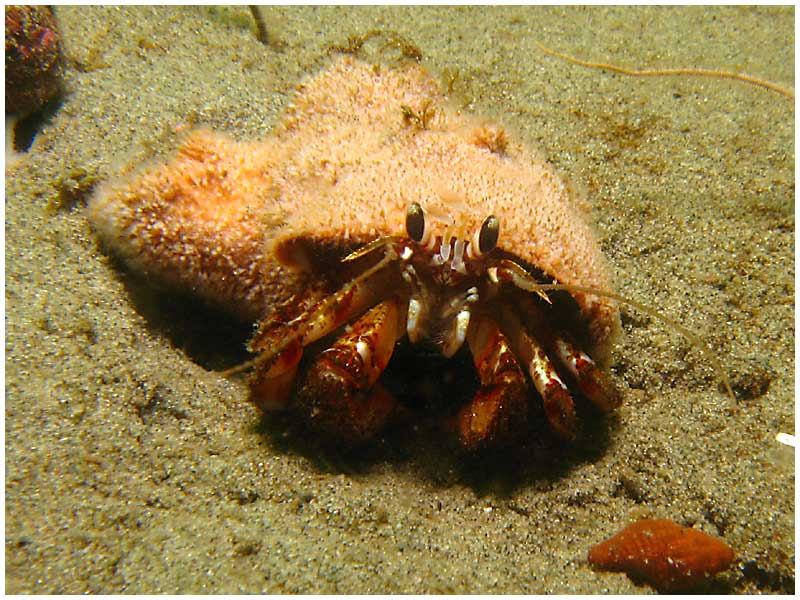
- Black-eyed hermit crab, Pagurus armatus

Scientific classification
- Kingdom: Animalia
- Phylum: Arthropoda
- Clade: Pancrustacea
- Class: Malacostraca
- Order: Decapoda
- Suborder: Pleocyemata
- Infraorder: Anomura
- Family: Paguridae
- Genus: Pagurus; Fabricius, 1775

Type species
- Cancer bernhardus Linnaeus, 1758

= Pagurus =

Genus of crustaceans

Pagurus is a genus of hermit crabs in the family Paguridae. Like other hermit crabs, their abdomen is not calcified and they use gastropod shells as protection. These marine decapod crustaceans are omnivorous, but mostly prey on small animals and scavenge carrion. Trigonocheirus and Pagurixus used to be considered subgenera of Pagurus, but the former is nowadays included in Orthopagurus, while the latter has been separated as a distinct genus.

== Species ==
Some 170 species are presently placed in Pagurus; many others have been placed here at one time but are now assigned to other genera of Paguroidea. The following list is current as of June 2012:

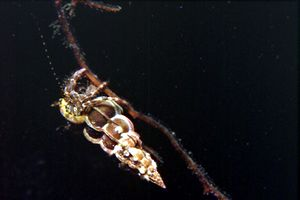
Pagurus anachoretus

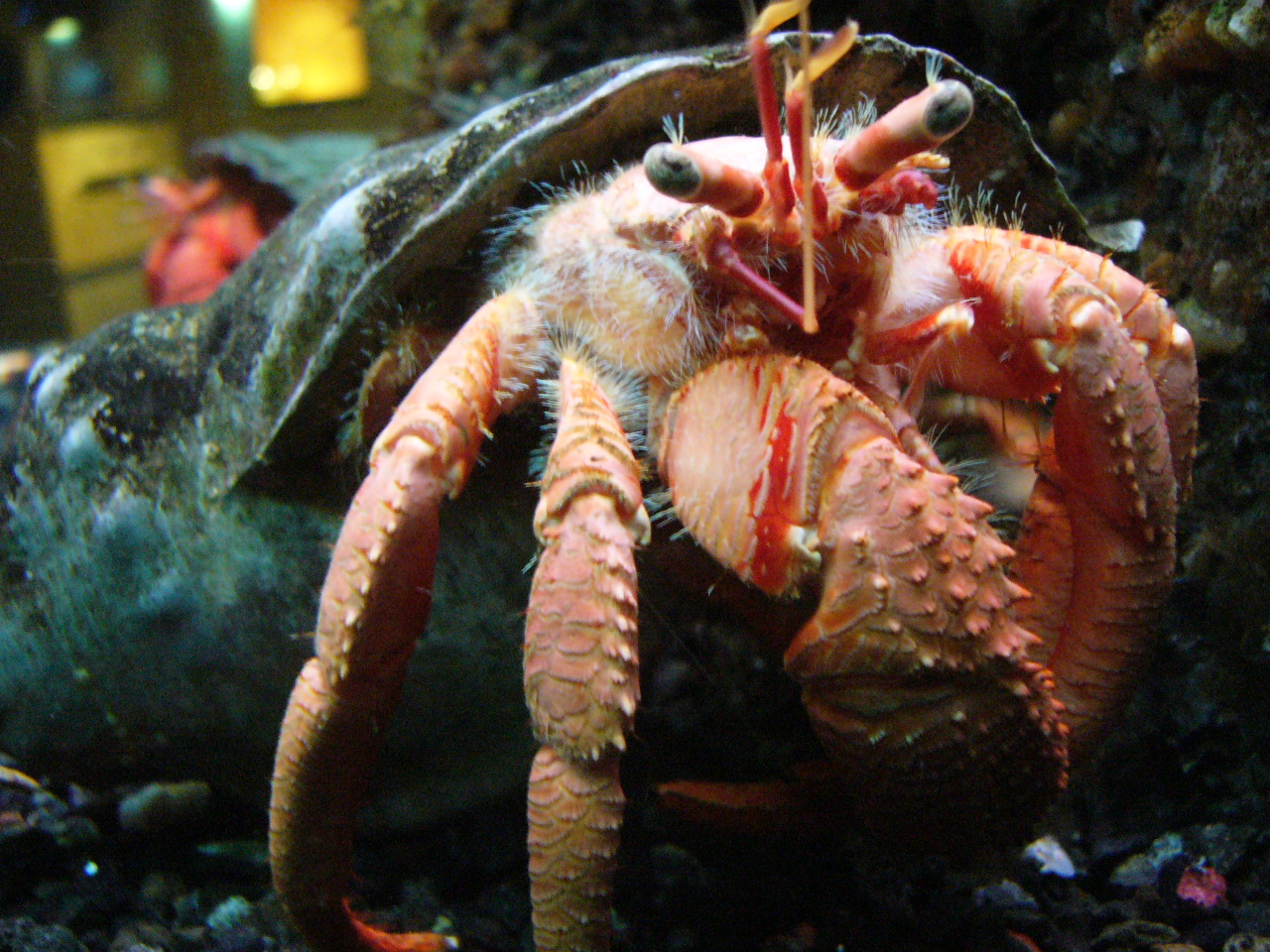
Pagurus bernhardus

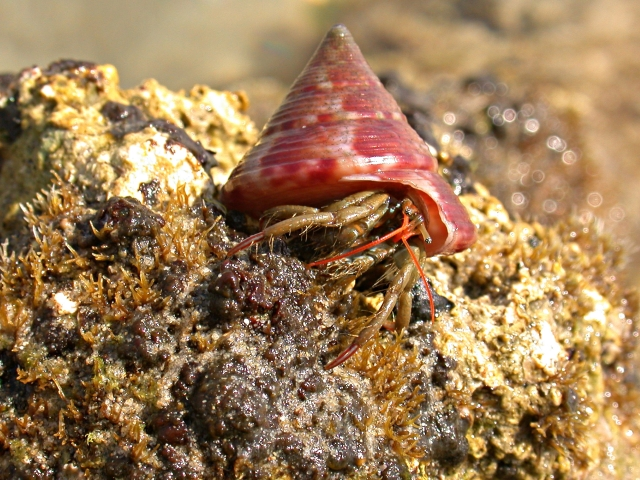
Long-armed hermit crab, Pagurus longicarpus

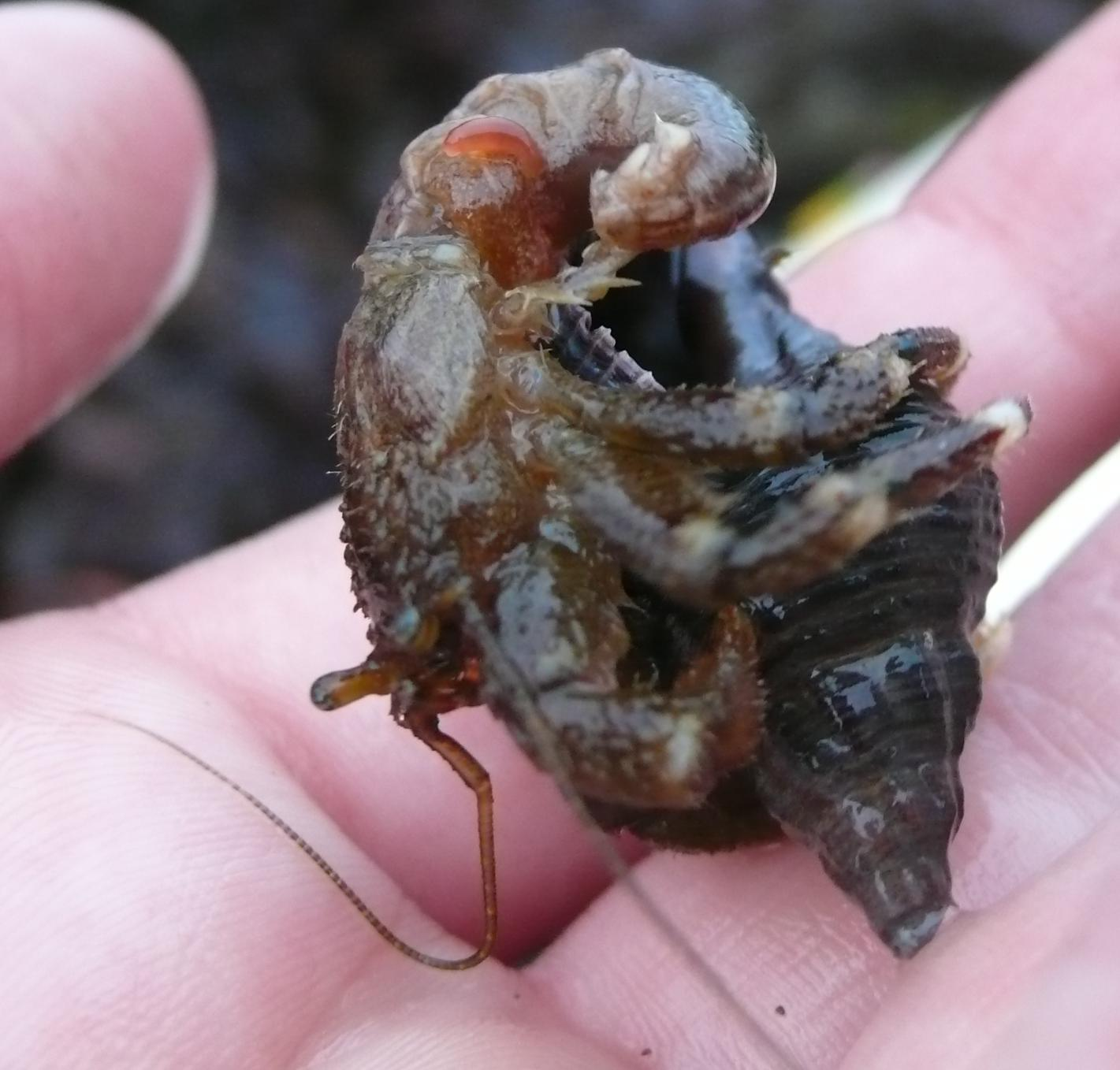
Hairy hermit crab, Pagurus hirsutiusculus, outside its shell – note the soft-shelled and curved abdomen (top of photo)

- Pagurus acadianus Benedict, 1901
- Pagurus alabamensis Rathbun, 1935 †
- Pagurus alaini Komai, 1998
- Pagurus alatus Fabricius, 1775
- Pagurus albidianthus de Saint Laurent & McLaughlin, 2000
- Pagurus albus (Benedict, 1892)
- Pagurus alcocki (Balss, 1911)
- Pagurus aleuticus (Benedict, 1892)
- Pagurus anachoretoides Forest, 1966
- Pagurus anachoretus Risso, 1827
- Pagurus angustus (Stimpson, 1858)
- Pagurus annexus McLaughlin & Haig, 1993
- Pagurus annulipes (Stimpson, 1860)
- Pagurus arcuatus Squires, 1964
- Pagurus arenisaxatilis Harvey & McLaughlin, 1991
- Pagurus armatus (Dana, 1851)
- Pagurus benedicti (Bouvier, 1892)
- Pagurus beringanus (Benedict, 1892)
- Pagurus bernhardus (Linnaeus, 1758)
- Pagurus boriaustraliensis Morgan, 1990
- Pagurus bouvieri (Faxon, 1895)
- Pagurus brachiomastus (Thallwitz, 1892)
- Pagurus brandti (Benedict, 1892)
- Pagurus brevidactylus (Stimpson, 1859)
- Pagurus brucei (Rathbun, 1926) †
- Pagurus bullisi Wass, 1963
- Pagurus capillatus (Benedict, 1892)
- Pagurus capsularis McLaughlin, 1997
- Pagurus carneus (Pocock, 1889)
- Pagurus carolinensis McLaughlin, 1975
- Pagurus carpoforminatus (Alcock, 1905)
- Pagurus caurinus Hart, 1971
- Pagurus cavicarpus (Paulson, 1875)
- Pagurus chevreuxi (Bouvier, 1896)
- Pagurus compressipes (Mieers, 1884)
- Pagurus comptus White, 1847
- Pagurus conformis (De Haan, 1849)
- Pagurus confragosus (Benedict, 1892)
- Pagurus confusus Komai & Yu, 1999
- Pagurus constans (Stimpson, 1858)
- Pagurus cornutus (Benedict, 1892)
- Pagurus criniticornis (Dana, 1852)
- Pagurus cuanensis Bell, 1845
- Pagurus curacaoensis (Benedict, 1892)
- Pagurus dalli (Benedict, 1892)
- Pagurus dartevellei (Forest, 1958)
- Pagurus decimbranchiae Komai & Osawa, 2001
- Pagurus defensus (Benedict, 1892)
- Pagurus delsolari Haig, 1974
- Pagurus dissimilis (A. Milne-Edwards & Bouvier, 1893)
- Pagurus edwardsii (Dana, 1852)
- Pagurus emmersoni McLaughlin & Forest, 1999
- Pagurus erythrogrammus Komai, 2003
- Pagurus excavatus (Herbst, 1791)
- Pagurus exiguus (Melin, 1939)
- Pagurus exilis (Benedict, 1892)
- Pagurus filholi (De Man, 1887)
- Pagurus fimbriatus Forest, 1966
- Pagurus forbesii Bell, 1845
- Pagurus forceps H. Milne-Edwards, 1836
- Pagurus fungiformis Komai & Rahayu, 2004
- Pagurus gladius (Benedict, 1892)
- Pagurus gordonae (Forest, 1956)
- Pagurus gracilipes (Stimpson, 1858)
- Pagurus granosimanus (Stimpson, 1859)
- Pagurus gymnodactylus Lemaitre, 1982
- Pagurus hartae (McLaughlin & Jensen, 1996)
- Pagurus heblingi Nucci & Melo, 2003
- Pagurus hedleyi (Grant & McCulloch, 1906)
- Pagurus hemphilli (Benedict, 1892)
- Pagurus hirsutiusculus (Dana, 1851)
- Pagurus holmi Ng & McLaughlin, 2009
- Pagurus ikedai Lemaitre & Watabe, 2005
- Pagurus imafukui McLaughlin & Konishi, 1994
- Pagurus imaii (Yokoya, 1939)
- Pagurus imarpe Haig, 1974
- Pagurus impressus (Benedict, 1892)
- Pagurus indicus Sarojini & Nagabhushanam, 1972
- Pagurus insulae Asakura, 1991
- Pagurus investigatoris (Alcock, 1905)
- Pagurus iridocarpus de Saint Laurent & McLaughlin, 2000
- Pagurus irregularis (A. Milne-Edwards & Bouvier, 1892)
- Pagurus japonicus (Stimpson, 1858)
- Pagurus kaiensis McLaughlin, 1997
- Pagurus kennerlyi (Stimpson, 1854)
- Pagurus kulkarnii Sankolli, 1962
- Pagurus lanuginosus De Haan, 1849
- Pagurus laurentae Forest, 1978
- Pagurus lepidus (Bouvier, 1898)
- Pagurus leptonyx Forest & de Saint Laurent, 1968
- Pagurus limatulus Fausto Filho, 1970
- Pagurus liochele (Barnard, 1947)
- Pagurus longicarpus Say, 1817
- Pagurus longimanus Wass, 1963
- Pagurus lophochela Komai, 1999
- Pagurus luticola Komai & Chan, 2006
- Pagurus macardlei (Alcock, 1905)
- Pagurus maclaughlinae Garcia-Gomez, 1982
- Pagurus maculosus Komai & Imafuku, 1996
- Pagurus malloryi Schweitzer & Feldmann, 2001 †
- Pagurus marshi Benedict, 1901
- Pagurus mbizi (Forest, 1955)
- Pagurus meloi Lemaitre & Cruz Castano, 2004
- Pagurus mertensii Brandt, 1851
- Pagurus middendorffii Brandt, 1851
- Pagurus minutus Hess, 1865
- Pagurus moluccensis Haig & Ball, 1988
- Pagurus nanodes Haig & Harvey, 1991
- Pagurus nesiotes Haig & McLaughlin, 1991
- Pagurus nigrivittatus Komai, 2003
- Pagurus nigrofascia Komai, 1996
- Pagurus nipponensis (Yokoya, 1933)
- Pagurus nisari Siddiqui & Komai, 2008
- Pagurus novizealandiae (Dana, 1852)
- Pagurus ochotensis Brandt, 1851
- Pagurus parvispina Komai, 1997
- Pagurus parvus (Benedict, 1892)
- Pagurus pectinatus (Stimpson, 1858)
- Pagurus pergranulatus (Henderson, 1896)
- Pagurus perlatus H. Milne-Edwards, 1848
- Pagurus pilosipes (Stimpson, 1858)
- Pagurus pilsbryi Roberts, 1962 †
- Pagurus pitagsaleei McLaughlin, 2002
- Pagurus politus (Smith, 1882)
- Pagurus pollicaris Say, 1817
- Pagurus prideaux Leach, 1815
- Pagurus protuberocarpus McLaughlin, 1982
- Pagurus provenzanoi Forest & de Saint Laurent, 1968
- Pagurus proximus Komai, 2000
- Pagurus pubescens Krøyer, 1838
- Pagurus pubescentulus (A. Milne-Edwards & Bouvier, 1892)
- Pagurus pulchellus (A. Milne-Edwards & Bouvier, 1892)
- Pagurus pycnacanthus (Forest, 1955)
- Pagurus quaylei Hart, 1971
- Pagurus quinquelineatus Komai, 2003
- Pagurus rathbuni (Benedict, 1892)
- Pagurus redondoensis Wicksten, 1982
- Pagurus retrorsimanus Wicksten & McLaughlin, 1998
- Pagurus rhabdotus Haig & Harvey, 1991
- Pagurus rotundimanus Wass, 1963
- Pagurus ruber (A. Milne-Edwards & Bouvier, 1892)
- Pagurus rubrior Komai, 2003
- Pagurus samoensis (Ortmann, 1892)
- Pagurus samuelis (Stimpson, 1857)
- Pagurus setosus (Benedict, 1892)
- Pagurus similimanus (Balss, 1921)
- Pagurus similis (Ortmann, 1892)
- Pagurus simulans Komai, 2000
- Pagurus sinuatus (Stimpson, 1858)
- Pagurus smithi (Benedict, 1892)
- Pagurus souriei (Forest, 1952)
- Pagurus spighti McLaughlin & Haig, 1993
- Pagurus spilocarpus Haig, 1977
- Pagurus spina Komai, 1994
- Pagurus spinulentus (Henderson, 1888)
- Pagurus stevensae Hart, 1971
- Pagurus sticticus McLaughlin, 2008
- Pagurus stimpsoni (A. Milne-Edwards & Bouvier, 1893)
- Pagurus tanneri (Benedict, 1892)
- Pagurus tenuilineatus (Rahayu, 2022)
- Pagurus townsendi (Benedict, 1892)
- Pagurus traversi (Filhol, 1885)
- Pagurus triangularis (Chevreux & Bouvier, 1892)
- Pagurus trichocerus Forest & de Saint Laurent, 1968
- Pagurus trigonocheirus (Stimpson, 1858)
- Pagurus tristanensis (Henderson, 1888)
- Pagurus tuberculosus Harvey, 1998 †
- Pagurus undosus (Benedict, 1892)
- Pagurus venturensis Coffin, 1957
- Pagurus vetaultae Harvey & McLaughlin, 1991
- Pagurus villosus Nicolet, 1849
- Pagurus virgulatus Haig & Harvey, 1991

The following are all nomina nuda. They have never been validly described as new species, but only mentioned under these names:

- Pagurus bunomanus Glassell, 1937
- Pagurus crenatus Hope, 1851
- Pagurus cuanensis Thompson, 1844
- Pagurus cultratus White, 1847
- Pagurus hirtimanus White, 1847
- Pagurus hyndmani Thompson, 1844
- Pagurus laevis Thompson, 1844
- Pagurus ulidiae Thompson, 1843
