= Pagurus proximus =

Scientific classification
- Domain: Eukaryota
- Kingdom: Animalia
- Phylum: Arthropoda
- Class: Malacostraca
- Order: Decapoda
- Suborder: Pleocyemata
- Infraorder: Anomura
- Family: Paguridae
- Genus: Pagurus
- Species: P. proximus

Binomial name
- Pagurus proximus Komai, 2000

Species of crustacean

Pagurus proximus is a species of hermit crab within the family Paguridae. Occurrences of the species have been made from China, South Korea, and Japan, with the holotype of the species being from Miyako Bay.
