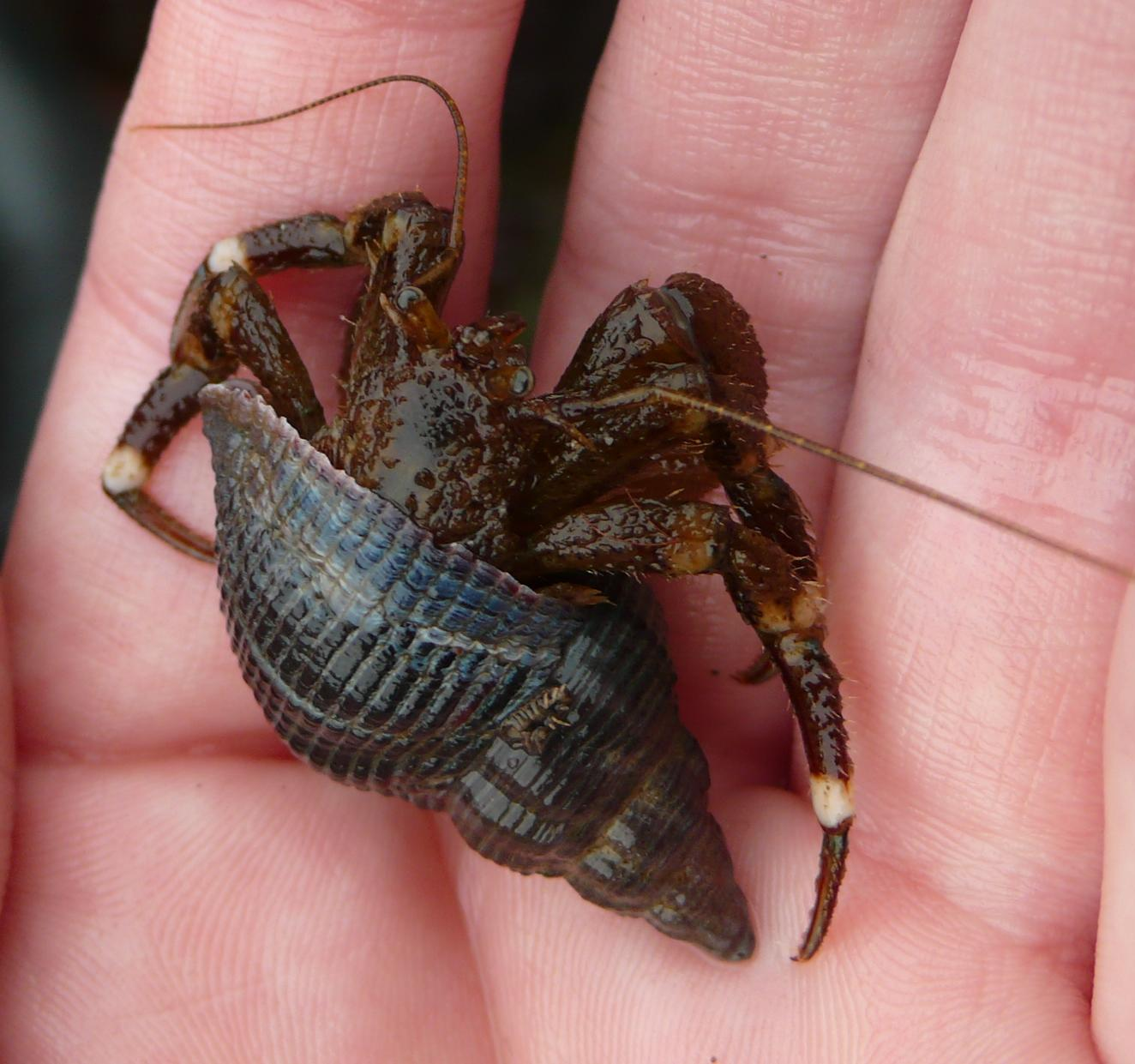

Scientific classification
- Kingdom: Animalia
- Phylum: Arthropoda
- Class: Malacostraca
- Order: Decapoda
- Suborder: Pleocyemata
- Infraorder: Anomura
- Family: Paguridae
- Genus: Pagurus
- Species: P. hirsutiusculus

Binomial name
- Pagurus hirsutiusculus (Dana, 1851)

Synonyms
- Bernhardus hirsutiusculus Dana, 1851; Eupagurus hirsutiusculus (Dana, 1851)

= Pagurus hirsutiusculus =

Species of crustacean

Pagurus hirsutiusculus is a species of hermit crab, commonly called the hairy hermit crab. It lives from the Bering Strait south to California and Japan, from the intertidal zone to a depth of 110 m (360 ft).

== Description ==
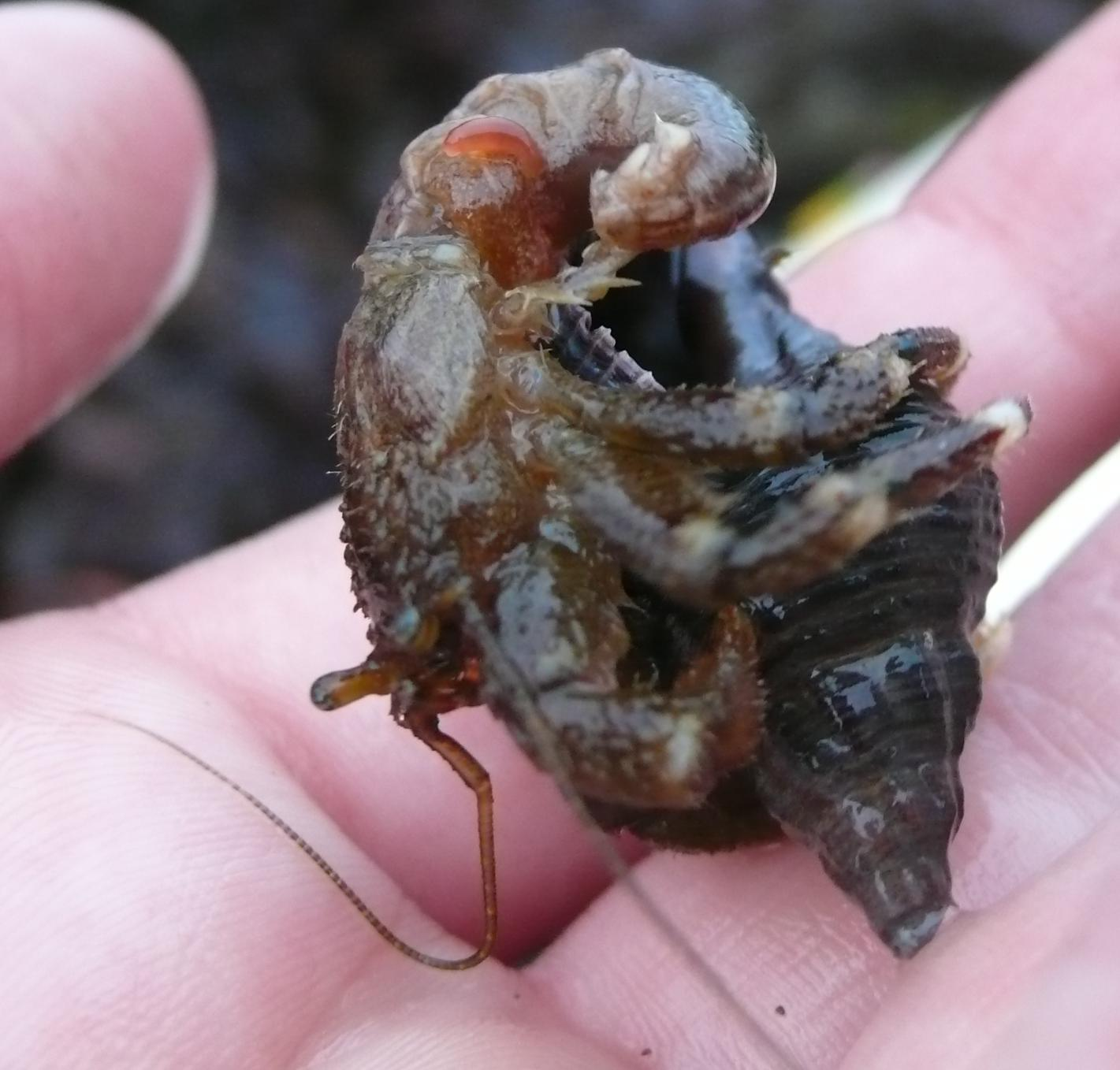
A female Pagurus hirsutiusculus withdrawing into a shell

Adults range in color from olive green to brown to black. Distinguishing characteristics of this hermit crab are white and often also blue bands on the walking legs. The antennae are grayish-brown with distinct white bands. This hermit crab is also easily identified by the remarkable amount of hair covering its body. The carapace of an adult P. hirsutiusculus may measure up to 19 mm (0.75 in) in length, and the animal's body may grow to 70 mm (2.8 in) in northern populations. Populations further south than Puget Sound are smaller and less hairy, and have been recognized as a separate subspecies, P. h. venturensis.

== Range and habitat ==
P. hirsutiusculus is found from the Pribilof Islands, Alaska to southern [California], and from the Bering Strait south to Japan. It lives at depths ranging from the middle intertidal zone to 110 m (360 ft), generally lower than Pagurus samuelis. It is commonly found in tide pools with sand or rock, and under rocks, logs, and seaweed, and is the common hermit crab of San Francisco Bay.

== Natural history ==
As is common with hermit crabs, P. hirsutiusculus carries an abandoned gastropod shell to protect itself. Individuals from calmer waters will readily leave their shell when confronted with a predator, a trait which the authors of Between Pacific Tides attributed to the lack of surf. the preferred shells are those of Nassa, Olivella biplicata, Nucella emarginata, Tectarius striatus, Epitonium tinctum, Alia carinata, Homalopoma luridum, Ilyanassa obsoleta, Urosalpinx cinerea, and Busycotypus canaliculatus. In the San Juan Archipelago, Pagurus hirsutiusculus has been found to carry the parasitic isopod Pseudione giardi.

P. hirsutiusculus mainly feeds on detritus, but is an opportunistic feeder and also feeds on seaweeds. The right chela of P. hirsutiusculus is significantly larger than the left and is used primarily for defense. The smaller left chela is used for fine motor work such as eating and selecting gastropod shells. The setae on the minor chela are sensitive to calcium, and help the hermit to judge whether the gastropod shell will be adequate to suit its needs.
