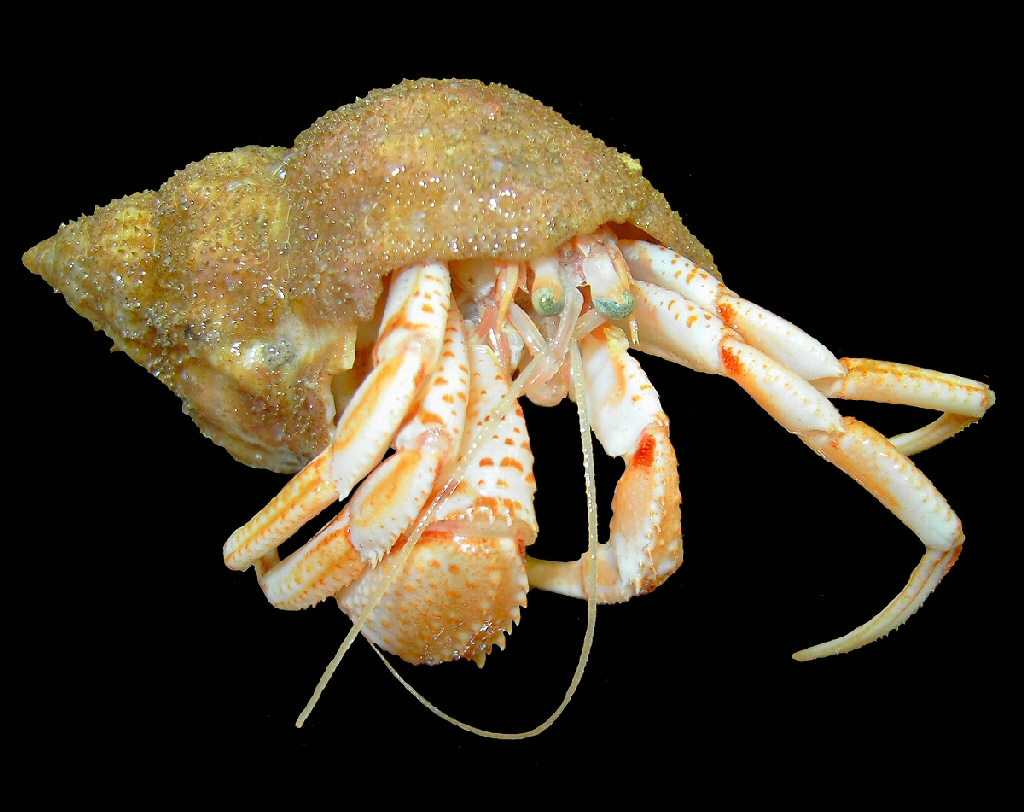

Scientific classification
- Kingdom: Animalia
- Phylum: Arthropoda
- Clade: Pancrustacea
- Class: Malacostraca
- Order: Decapoda
- Suborder: Pleocyemata
- Infraorder: Anomura
- Family: Paguridae
- Genus: Pagurus
- Species: P. bernhardus

Binomial name
- Pagurus bernhardus (Linnaeus, 1758)

Synonyms
- Bernhardus typicus Dana, 1851; Cancer bernhardus Linnaeus, 1758; Eupagurus bernhardus (Linnaeus, 1767); Pagurus streblonyx Leach, 1815; Pagurus ulidianus Bell, 1845

= Pagurus bernhardus =

Species of crustacean

Pagurus bernhardus is the common marine hermit crab of Europe's Atlantic coasts. It is sometimes referred to as the common hermit crab or soldier crab. Its carapace reaches 3.5 centimetres (1.4 in) long, and is found in both rocky and sandy areas, from the Arctic waters of Iceland, Svalbard and Russia as far south as southern Portugal, its range extends as far as the Mediterranean Sea. It can be found in pools on the upper shore and at the mean tide level down to a depth of approximately 140 metres (460 ft), with smaller specimens generally found in rock pools around the middle shore and lower shore regions, with larger individuals at depth. P. bernhardus is an omnivorous detritivore that opportunistically scavenges for carrion, and which can also filter feed when necessary.

Illustration by Augusta Foote Arnold.

Pagurus bernhardus uses shells of a number of gastropod species for protection, including Littorina littorea, Littorina obtusata, Nassarius reticulatus, Gibbula umbilicalis, Nucella lapillus and Buccinum. In the warmer parts of its range, the sea anemone Calliactis parasitica is often found growing on the shell occupied by Pagurus bernhardus. In colder waters, this role is filled by Hormathia digitata. Hermit crabs fight one another for gastropod shells and have a preference for shells of certain species.
