= Popcorn effect =

Popcorn effect may refer to:

- The tendency of larger particles to bounce higher than smaller ones on high-frequency vibrating screens
- The possibility of moisture causing defects in electronics; see:
  - Moisture sensitivity level
  - Mobile device forensics

== See also ==
- Cheerios effect
- Brazil nut effect
