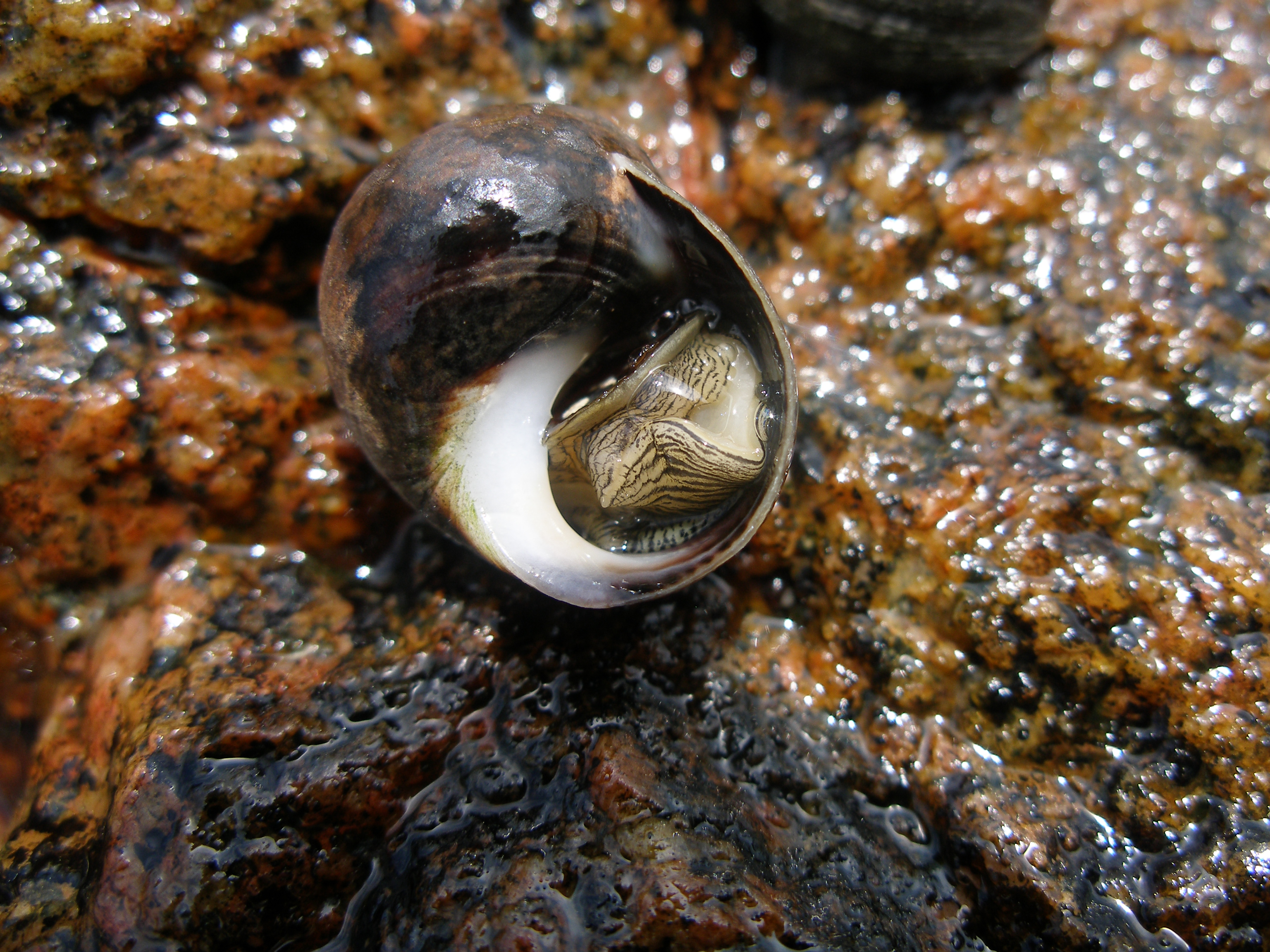
- Periwinkle emerging from its shell, Sweden
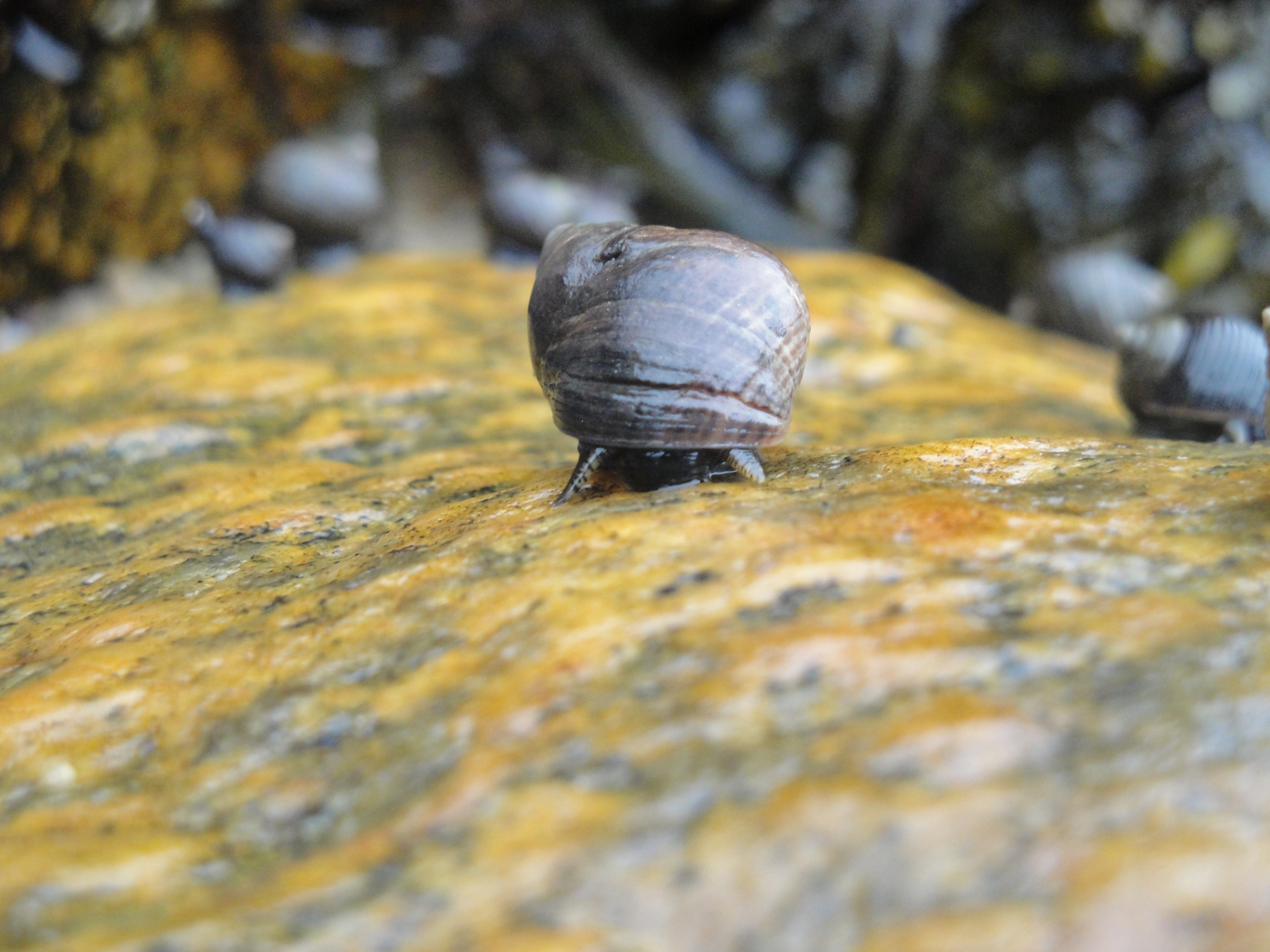
- L. littorea on the edge of a small sandy beach in Woods Hole, Massachusetts

Scientific classification
- Kingdom: Animalia
- Phylum: Mollusca
- Class: Gastropoda
- Subclass: Caenogastropoda
- Order: Littorinimorpha
- Family: Littorinidae
- Genus: Littorina
- Species: L. littorea

Binomial name
- Littorina littorea (Linnaeus, 1758)

Synonyms
- List: Littorina armoricana Locard, 1886; Littorina bartonensis Brown, 1843; Littorina communis Brown, 1843; Littorina litorea (Turton, 1819); Littorina litorea var. brevicula Jeffreys, 1865; Littorina litorea var. paupercula Jeffreys, 1865; Littorina litorea var. sinistrorsa Jeffreys, 1865; Littorina litorea var. turrita Jeffreys, 1865; Littorina littorea f. intermedia Brøgger, 1901; Littorina littorea var. angulata Harmer, 1920; Littorina littorea var. antiqua Wood, 1848; Littorina littorea var. balteata Dautzenberg & Durouchoux, 1912; Littorina littorea var. complanata Harmer, 1920; Littorina littorea var. conica Harmer, 1920; Littorina littorea var. deformis Wood, 1848; Littorina littorea var. delphinula Wood, 1848; Littorina littorea var. distorta Harmer, 1920; Littorina littorea var. elegans Wood, 1848; Littorina littorea var. fuscofasciatus Middendorff, 1849; Littorina littorea var. major Dautzenberg & Durouchoux, 1913; Littorina littorea var. miniata Dautzenberg & Durouchoux, 1900; Littorina littorea var. pallida Dautzenberg & Durouchoux, 1900; Littorina littorea var. pallidefasciatus Middendorff, 1849; Littorina littorea var. parva Harmer, 1920; Littorina littorea var. picta Wood, 1848; Littorina littorea var. pyramidata Wood, 1848; Littorina littorea var. sanguinea Dautzenberg & Durouchoux, 1906; Littorina littorea var. truncata Harmer, 1920; Littorina littorea var. unicarinata Raeymaekers, 1889; Littorina parva Teilman-Friis, 1898; Littorina rudis var. aurantia Dautzenberg & P. Fischer, 1925; Littorina rudis var. reevei Harmer, 1921; Littorina sphaeroidalis Locard, 1886; Littorina vulgaris J. Sowerby, 1832; Turbo bicarinatus Woodward, 1833; Turbo carinatus Woodward, 1833; Turbo elongatus Woodward, 1833; Turbo litoreus Turton, 1819; Turbo littoreus Linnaeus, 1758 (basionym); Turbo sulcatus Woodward, 1833; Turbo ustulatus Lamarck, 1822; Turbo ventricosus Woodward, 1833

= Common periwinkle =

Species of mollusc

The common periwinkle or winkle (Littorina littorea) is a small intertidal snail species. It has a mantle, gills and a shell with an operculum, and therefore is a marine gastropod classified within the family Littorinidae, the periwinkles.

This is a robust intertidal species with a dark and sometimes banded shell. It is native to the rocky shores of the northeastern, and introduced to the northwestern, Atlantic Ocean.

== Description ==
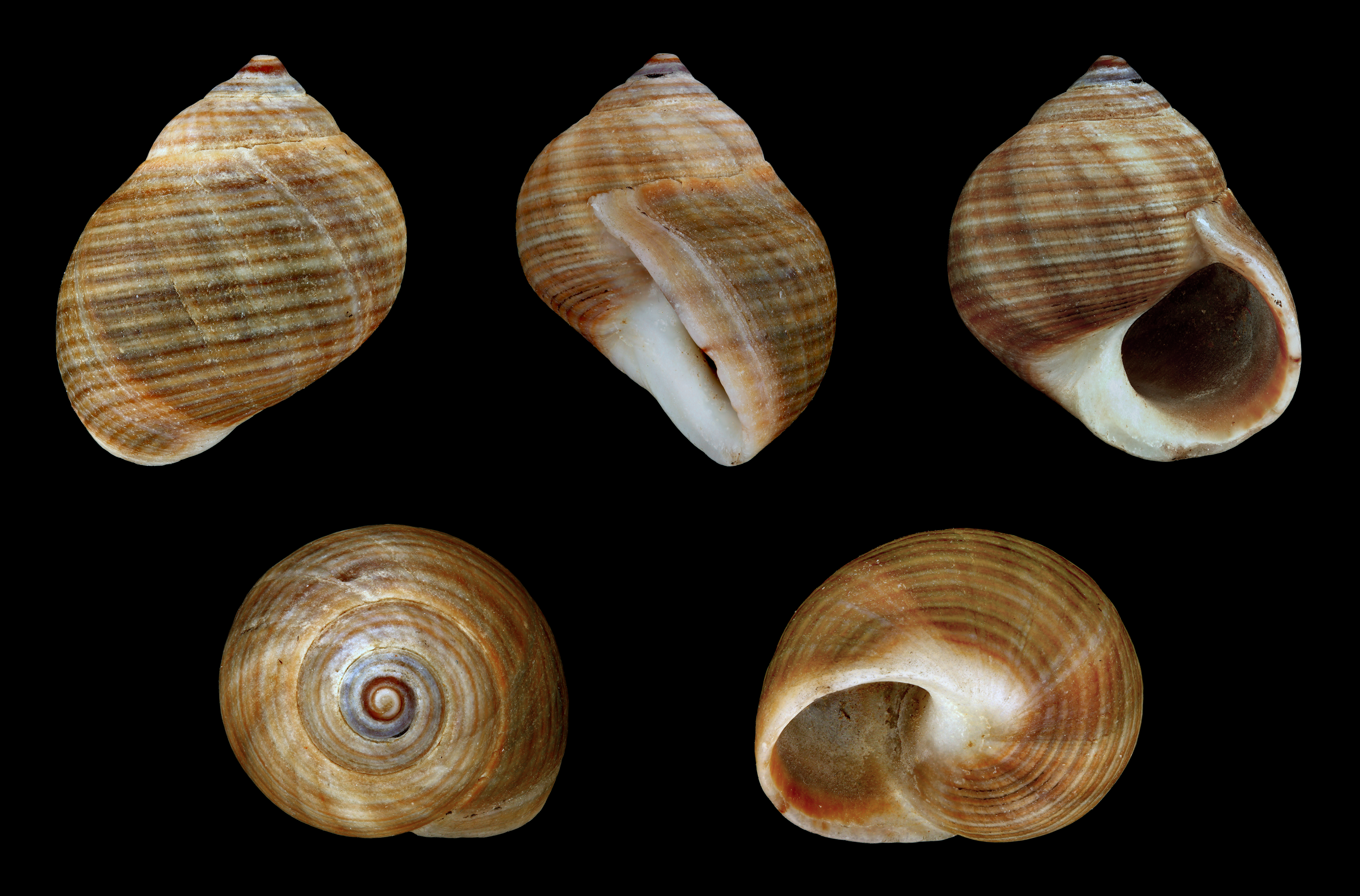
Shell of the common periwinkle

The shell is broadly ovate, thick, and sharply pointed except when eroded. The shell contains six to seven whorls with some fine threads and wrinkles. The color varies from grayish to gray-brown, often with dark spiral bands. The base of the columella is white. The shell lacks an umbilicus. The white outer lip is sometimes checkered with brown patches. The inside of the shell is chocolate brown.

The width of the shell ranges from 10 to 12 millimetres (3/8 to 1/2 in) at maturity, with an average length of 16 to 38 mm (5/8 to 1 1/2 in). Shell height can reach up to 30 to 52 mm (1 1/8 to 2 in), The length is measured from the end of the aperture to the apex. The height is measured by placing the shell with the aperture flat on a surface and measuring vertically.

L. littorea can be highly variable in phenotype, with several different morphs known. Its phenotypic variations may be indicative of speciation, as opposed to phenotypic plasticity. This is of particular importance to evolutionary biology, as it may represent an opportunity to observe a transitional phase in the evolution of an organism.

=== Life cycle ===
L. littorea is oviparous, reproducing annually with internal fertilization of egg capsules that are then shed directly into the sea, leading to a planktotrophic larval development time of four to seven weeks. Females lay 10,000 to 100,000 eggs contained in a corneous capsule from which pelagic larvae escape and eventually settle to the bottom. This species can breed year round depending on the local climate. Benson suggests that it reaches maturity at 10 mm and normally lives five to ten years. while Moore suggests that maturity is reached in 18 months. Some specimens have lived 20 years.

Female specimens have been observed to be ripe from February until end of May, when most are spawning. Male specimens are mainly ripe from January until the end of May and lose weight after copulation. The young seem to settle primarily from the end of May to the end of June, although other sources indicate earlier settlement.

=== Growth rate ===
A study in Plymouth Sound suggests an initial growth reaching up to 14 mm (1/2 in) in height December the first year, and 17.4 mm (5/8 in) by the end of the second year. Females seem to grow more rapidly than males, and in specimens above 25 mm (1 in) in height, females seem to dominate. Another study undertaken in Blackwater Estuary, Essex showed growth reaching up to 8 mm (3/8 in) the first winter.

== Distribution ==
Common periwinkles are native to the northeastern coasts of the Atlantic Ocean, including northern Spain, France, Great Britain, Ireland, Scandinavia, and Russia.

There have been more than 14,000 observations made available as a dataset at the Global Biodiversity Information Facility - Littorina littorea, which can be explored. More distribution information can also be found at Ocean Biographic Information System - Littorina littorea. The NBN Gateway - Littorina littorea has a distribution map over the UK and Ireland. These datasets may overlap.

=== Introductions to North America ===
Common periwinkles were introduced to the Atlantic coast of North America, possibly by rock ballast in the mid-19th century. This species is also found on the west coast of the United States, from Washington to California. The first recorded sighting in the East was in 1840 in the Gulf of St. Lawrence. It is now abundant on rocky shores from New Jersey northward to Newfoundland. In Canada, its range includes New Brunswick, Nova Scotia, Quebec, Newfoundland and Labrador.

L. littorea is now the most common marine snail along the North Atlantic coast. It has changed North Atlantic intertidal ecosystems via grazing activities, altering the distribution and abundance of algae on rocky shores and converting soft-sediment habitats to hard substrates, as well as competitively displacing native species.

== Ecology ==
=== Habitat ===
The common periwinkle is mainly found on rocky shores in the higher and middle intertidal zone. It sometimes lives in small tide pools. It may also be found in muddy habitats such as estuaries and can reach depths of 55 metres (180 ft). When exposed to either extreme cold or heat while climbing, a periwinkle will withdraw into its shell and start rolling, which may allow it to fall to the water.

=== Zone ===
Movement both horizontally and vertically in response to light and dark as well as temperatures have been observed, but over a short timespan the movement seems to be random.

Experiments seem to indicate that the snail responds to light and current, and moves accordingly.

=== Feeding ===
L. littorea is an omnivorous, grazing intertidal gastropod. It is primarily an algae grazer, but it will feed on small invertebrates such as barnacle larvae. It uses its radula to scrape algae from rocks and, in the salt marsh community, pick up algae from cord grass or from the biofilm that covers the surface of mud in estuaries or bays. Macroalgae that are readily consumed include Ulva lactuca and Ulva intestinalis; if provided, blue mussel can also be eaten.

The radula is taenioglossate, consisting of seven teeth per row: one middle tooth, flanked on each side by one lateral and two marginal teeth. The radula is used to scrape algae and detritus.

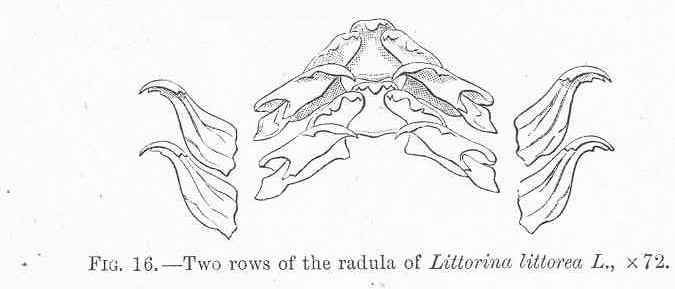

Phlorotannins in the brown algae Fucus vesiculosus and Ascophyllum nodosum act as chemical defenses against L. littorea.

=== Parasites ===
The common periwinkle can act as a host for various parasites, including Renicola roscovita, Cryptocotyle lingua, Microphallus pygmaeus and Himasthla sp. More studies are needed before any conclusions regarding the effect of parasites on growth can be reached. It seems that growth rate is primarily affected on available food and time available for feeding, rather than parasites.

Polydora ciliata has also been found to excavate burrows in the shell of the common periwinkle when the snail is mature (above 10 mm (0.39 in) long). The reason why this happens only to mature snails is not yet known, but one hypothesis is that a mature snail will excrete a signal substance which attracts the P. ciliata larvae. Another hypothesis is that a mature snail has a change in the shell surface that makes it suitable for P. ciliata larvae to settle. The infection by this parasite does not seem to alter the growth and proportions of the snail shell.

=== Mortality ===
A mortality rate of up to 94% per annum has been observed for the first two months, followed by up to 60% per annum for the rest of the first year:

...out of every 950 shells of all ages [collected] at that time, 850 are first year, and 100 are in their second or subsequent year.

Older individuals above 15 months old seem to have a mortality of only 23% per annum. Cercaria emasculans is known to be fatal to the snail, but this does not account for the observed mortality.

== Human use ==
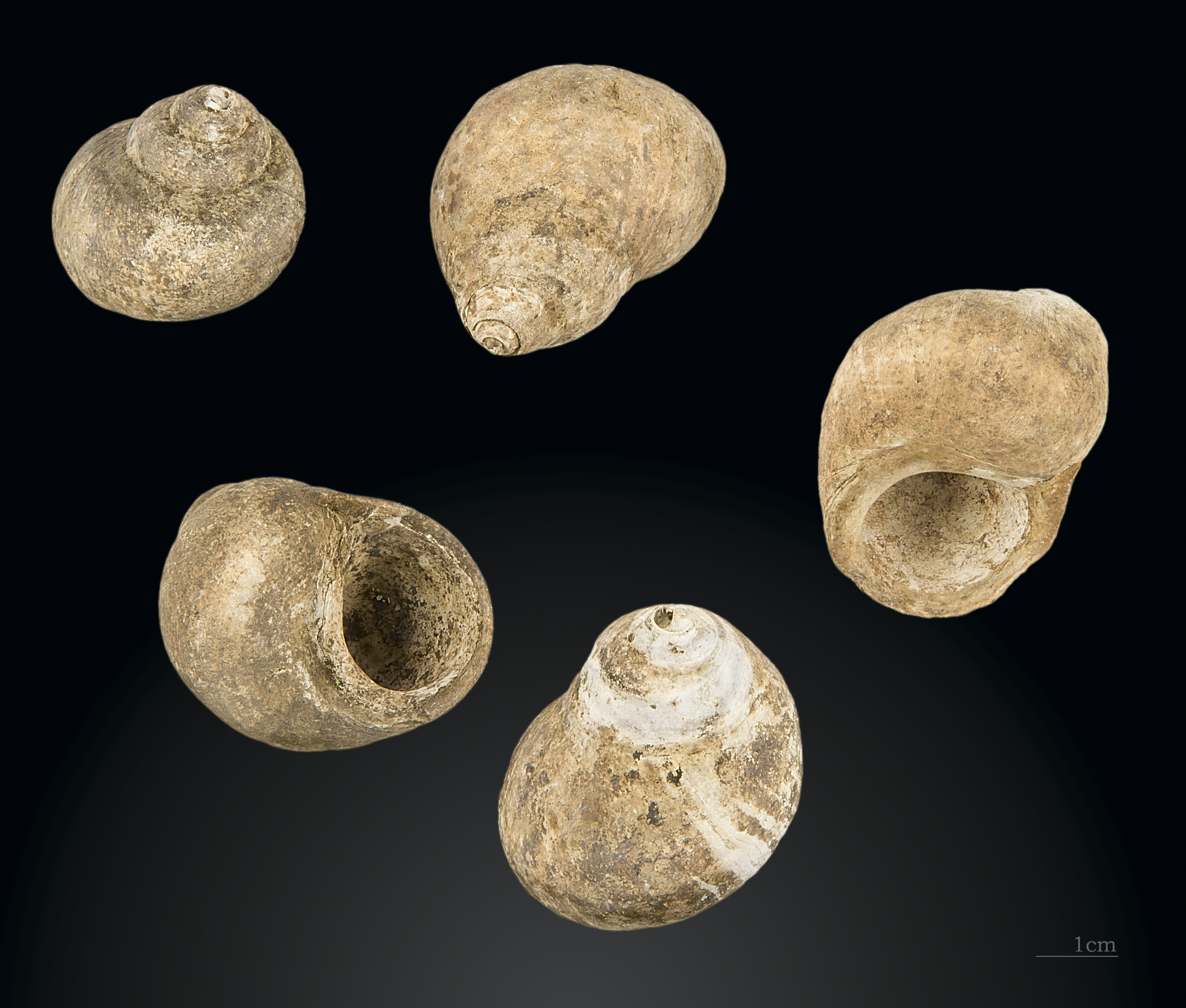
Remains of an ancient meal. Winkle shells from Cantabrian Lower Magdalenian layer (15 000 before present) in the Altamira cave

This species appears in prehistoric shellfish middens throughout Europe, and is believed to have been an important source of food since at least 7500 B.C.E. in Scotland. It is still collected in quantity in Scotland, mostly for export to the Continent and also for local consumption. The official landings figures for Scotland indicate over 2,000 tonnes of winkles are exported annually. This makes winkles the sixth most important shellfish harvested in Scotland in terms of tonnage, and seventh most important in terms of value. However, since actual harvests are probably twice reported levels, the species may actually be the fourth and sixth most important, respectively.

Periwinkles are usually picked off the rocks by hand or caught in a drag from a boat. They are mostly eaten in the coastal areas of Scotland, England, Wales and Ireland, where they are commonly referred to as winkles or in some areas buckies, willicks, or wilks. In Belgium, they are called kreukels or caracoles. In Newfoundland and Labrador, they are commonly referred to as "wrinkles".

They are commonly sold in paper bags near beaches in Ireland and Scotland, boiled in their local seawater, with a pin attached to the bag to enable the extraction of the soft parts from the shell.

Periwinkles are considered a delicacy in African and Asian cuisines. The meat is high in protein, omega-3 fatty acids and low in fat; according to the USDA National Nutrient Database for Standard Reference, raw snails in general are about 80% water, 15% protein, and 1.4% fat.

Periwinkles are also used as bait for catching small fish. The shell is usually crushed and the soft parts extracted and put on a hook.

In accordance with their history as an ancient food source in Atlantic Europe, they are harvested and consumed in the Azores Islands by the Portuguese people, where they are usually called búzios, the generic name for sea snails.

=== Supply chain ===
As for seafood supply chains in general, the supply chain consists of a collector, processor, distributor and finally the retailer. The true nature of the supply chain is usually more complex and opaque, with the potential for records of harvesting areas and date of catch to be falsified.

=== Collection ===
Commonly harvested in buckets by workers walking in the intertidal zone on low tide; other methods have been tried.

In Maine, the snails are commonly collected by a dredge towed from a vessel.

In Norway, snorkeling has also been used.

A report on the state of the periwinkle industry in Ireland suggests a maximum catch size in order to preserve the population.

External videos
- Dredging for periwinkles, YouTube video
- Snorkeling for periwinkles, YouTube video

=== Processor ===
The processor buys in bulk from the collector, involving a possibly long transport route by land in a refrigerator truck or airplane, taking care to avoid temperatures below 0 °C (32 °F).

If fresh seawater is readily available, the periwinkles are first graded if possible, using a machine custom built for the purpose. The method used for grading differs, but two proven methods include a Trommel screen with horizontal bars instead of a mesh, and a circle-throw vibrating machine also using bars. The price to purchase a complete sorting machine can be €10,000 or more.

Periwinkles are graded by number of snails per kilogram. The following table displays some common grades in France. The actual value depends upon supply and demand, with seasonal variations. The actual ranges may also differ from each establishment.

| Grade name | Number per kilogram |
|---|---|
| Small | Unknown |
| Medium | Unknown |
| Large | 180–240 |
| Jumbo | 140–180 |
| Super Jumbo | 90–140 |

After grading, the periwinkles are "climbed" close to the consumer, which involves checking whether they are still alive. This can take anywhere from a few hours to several days, depending on how healthy the periwinkles are and the temperature of the water they climb in. Any periwinkles left immobile at the bottom are considered dead and are discarded. It is not uncommon to have up to 8% waste in a shipment.

Hereafter, the winkles are commonly packed in smaller quantities before being distributed to customers. Mesh bags from 3 to 10 kg (6.6 to 22.0 lb) are common.

=== Distributor ===
To sell large quantities, distributors are commonly used to move the periwinkles to the retailer. These have networks of transport available both internationally, regionally and locally inside a city. Several distributors are usually involved in the complete journey, each focusing on its own part of the transport network.

=== Retail ===
The common periwinkle is sold by fishmongers at seafood markets in large cities around the world, and is also commonly found in seafood restaurants as an appetizer or as a part of a seafood platter. In some countries, pubs may serve periwinkles as a snack.

Most of the volume fished is consumed by France, Belgium, Spain and the Netherlands.

=== Methods to increase commercial value ===
Ongrowing has been investigated as a potential way of increasing commercial value, but no documented pilot facilities have been established. By harvesting the periwinkle during the summer and storing them with feed until December, not only should the grade have been increased, but the market value should be higher since supply is lower in the cold winter months.

=== Aquaculture ===
Raising the common periwinkle has not been a focus due to its abundance in nature and relatively low price; however, there are potential benefits from aquaculture of this species, including a more controlled environment, easier harvesting, less damages from predators, as well as saving the natural population from commercial harvesting.

=== Packaging ===
Commonly packed in 3 kg (6.6 lb) boxes by the processor, the box is usually polystyrene foam or thin wood, depending on the market demands. Holes in the box ensures that any water lost by the snails drains out, so that they remain in better condition for longer. A label indicates the fishing zone, packaging date, and any other information required by law.

=== Storing ===
In a refrigerator, the common periwinkle can usually be stored for up to a week, but this may vary depending on how long they have been stored prior to sale, and how they have been kept since the moment they are fished. As long as they are kept moist and cold, they can survive well for a longer period of time. It is not recommended to store at temperatures below 0 °C (32 °F), even if research has shown a Median Lower Lethal Temperature of −13.0 °C (8.6 °F). Even if the common periwinkle survives when put back into seawater, they seem to be unable to move and climb.

== See also ==
- Tegula pfeifferi
