= Trommel screen =

Machine separating materials

A trommel screen, also known as a rotary screen, is a mechanical screening machine used to separate materials, mainly in the mineral and solid-waste processing industries. It consists of a perforated cylindrical drum that is normally elevated at an angle at the feed end. Physical size separation is achieved as the feed material spirals down the rotating drum, where the undersized material smaller than the screen apertures passes through the screen, while the oversized material exits at the other end of the drum. The name "trommel" comes from the German word for "drum".

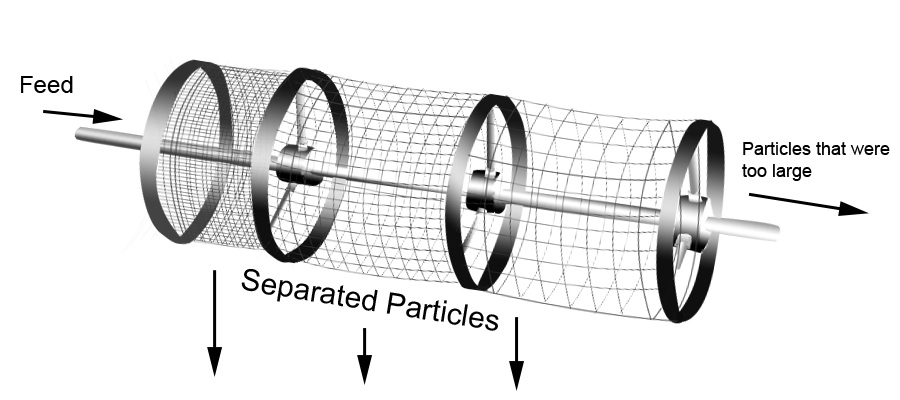
Figure 1 Trommel screen

== Summary ==
Trommel screens can be used in a variety of applications such as classification of solid waste and recovery of valuable minerals from raw materials. Trommels come in many designs such as concentric screens, series or parallel arrangement and each component has a few configurations. However depending on the application required, trommels have several advantages and limitations over other screening processes such as vibrating screens, grizzly screens, roller screens, curved screens and gyratory screen separators.

Some of the main governing equations for a trommel screen include the screening rate, screening efficiency and residence time of particles in the screen. These equations could be applied in the rough calculation done in initial phases of a design process. However, design is largely based on heuristics. Therefore, design rules are often used in place of the governing equations in the design of a trommel screen. When designing a trommel screen, the main factors affecting the screening efficiency and production rate are the rotational velocity of the drum, mass flow rate of feed particles, size of the drum, and inclination of trommel screen. Depending on desired application of trommel screen, a balance has to be made between the screening efficiency and production rate.

== Range of application ==
=== Municipal and industrial waste ===
Trommel screens are used by the municipal waste industry in the screening process to classify sizes of solid waste. Besides that, it can also be used to improve the recovery of fuel-derived solid waste. This is done by removing inorganic materials such as moisture and ash from the air-classified light fraction segregated from shredded solid waste, thereby increasing the quality of the product fuel. In addition, trommel screens are used for the treatment of wastewater. For this particular application, solids from the entering flow will settle onto the screen mesh and the drum will rotate once the liquid reaches a certain level. The clean area of the screen is submerged into the liquid while the trapped solids fall onto a conveyor which will be further processed before removal.

=== Mineral processing ===
Trommel screens are also used for the grading of raw materials to recover valuable minerals. The screen will segregate minuscule materials which are not in the suitable range of size to be used in the crushing stage. It also helps to get rid of dust particles which will otherwise impair the performance of the subsequent machineries in the downstream processes.

=== Other applications ===
Other applications of trommel screens can be seen in the screening process of composts as an enhancement technique. It selects composts of variable size fractions to get rid of contaminants and incomplete composted residues, forming end products with a variety of uses. Besides this, the food industries use trommel screens to sort dry food of different sizes and shapes. The classification process will help to achieve the desired mass or heat transfer rate and avoid under or over-processing. It also screens tiny food such as peas and nuts that are strong enough to resist the rotational force of the drum.

== Designs available ==
One of the available designs of trommel screens is concentric screens with the coarsest screen located at the innermost section. It can also be designed in parallel in which objects exit one stream and enter the following. A trommel in series is a single drum whereby each section has different apertures size arranged from the finest to the coarsest

The trommel screen has many different configurations. For the drum component, an internal screw is fitted when the placement of the drum is flat or elevated at an angle less than 5°. The internal screw facilitates the movement of objects through the drum by forcing them to spiral.

For an inclined drum, objects are being lifted and then dropped with the help of lifter bars to move it further down the drum which the objects will otherwise roll down slower. Furthermore, the lifter bars shake the objects to segregate them. Lifter bars will not be considered in the presence of heavy objects as they may break the screen.

As for the screens, perforated plate screens or mesh screens are usually used. Perforated plate screen are rolled and welded for strength. This design contains fewer ridges which makes it easier for the cleaning process. On the other hand, mesh screen are replaceable as it is susceptible to wear and tear compared to perforated screen. In addition, screw cleaning work for this design is more intensive as objects tend to get wedged in the mesh ridges.

The screen's aperture comes in either square or round shape which is determined by many operating factors such as:

1. The required dimension of the undersized product.
2. The aperture area. Round aperture contributes to a smaller area than square-shaped one.
3. The magnitude of the agitation of product.
4. Cleanup of drum.

== Advantages and limitations over competitive processes ==
=== Vibrating screen ===
Trommel screens are cheaper to produce than vibrating screens. They are vibration free which causes less noise than vibrating screens. Trommel screens are more mechanically robust than vibrating screens allowing it to last longer under mechanical stress.

However more material can be screened at once for a vibrating screen compared to a trommel screen. This is because only one part of the screen area of the trommel screen is utilised during the screening process whilst the entire screen is used for a vibrating screen. Trommel screens are also more susceptible to plugging and blinding, especially when different sized screen apertures are in series. Plugging is when material larger than the aperture may become stuck or wedged into the apertures and then may be forced through which is undesirable. Blinding is when wet material clump up and stick to the surface of the screen. The vibrations in the vibrating screens reduce the risk of plugging and blinding.

=== Grizzly screen ===
A grizzly screen is a grid or set of parallel metal bars set in an inclined stationary frame. The slope and the path of the material are usually parallel to the length of the bars. The length of the bar may be up to 3 m and the spacing between the bars ranges from 50 to 200 mm. Grizzly screens are typically used in mining to limit the size of material passing into a conveyance or size reduction stage.

== Construction ==
The material of construction of the bars is usually manganese steel to reduce wear. Usually, the bar is shaped in such a way that its top is wider than the bottom, and hence the bars can be made fairly deep for strength without being choked by lumps passing partway through them.

== Working ==
A coarse feed (say from a primary crusher) is fed at the upper end of the grizzly. Large chunks roll and slide to the lower end (tail discharge), while small lumps having sizes less than the openings in the bars fall through the grid into a separate collector.

=== Roller screen ===
Roller screens are preferred to trommel screens when the feed rate required is high. They also cause less noise than trommel screens and require less head room. Viscous and sticky materials are easier to be separated using a roller screen than with a trommel screen.

=== Curved screen ===
Curved screens are able to separate finer particles (200-3000 μm) than trommel screens. However, binding may occur if the particle size is less than 200 μm which will affect the separation efficiency. The screening rate of a curved screen is also much higher than the trommel screen as the whole surface area of the screen is utilised. Furthermore, for curved screens, the feed flows parallel to the apertures. This allows any loose material to break up from the jagged surface of the larger materials, resulting in more undersized particles passing through.

=== Gyratory screen separators ===
Finer particle sizes (>40 μm) are able to be separated with the gyratory separator than with a trommel screen. The size of the gyratory screen separator can be adjusted through removable trays, whereas the trommel screen is usually fixed. Gyratory separators can also separate dry and wet materials like trommel screens. However, it is common for the gyratory separators to separate either dry or wet materials only. This is because there are different parameters for the gyratory screen to have the best separation efficiency. Therefore, two separators would be required for the separation of dry and wet materials, while one trommel screen would be able to do the same job.

== Main process characteristics ==
=== Screening rate ===
One of the main process characteristics of interest is the screening rate of the trommel. Screening rate is related to the probability of the undersized particles passing through the screen apertures upon impact. Based on the assumption that the particle falls perpendicularly on the screen surface, the probability of passage, P, is simply given as

$P = (1-\dfrac{d}{a})^2 Q \,$	1

where $d$ refers to the particle size, $a$ refers to the size of aperture (diameter or length) and $Q$ refers to the ratio of aperture area to the total screen area. Equation (1) holds for both square and circular apertures. However, for rectangular apertures, the equation becomes:

$P = (1-\dfrac{d}{a})(1-\dfrac{d}{A}) Q \,$	2

where $a$ and $A$ refers to the rectangular dimension of the aperture. After determining the probability of passage of a given size interval of particles through the screen, the fraction of particles remaining in the screen, $V$, can be found using:

$V(n) = (1-P)^n \,$	3

where $n$ is the number of impingements of the particles on the screen. After making the assumption that the number of impingements per unit time, $\sigma_{t}$, is constant, equation (3) becomes:

$V(t) = (1-P)^{\sigma ^{t}_{t}} \,$	4

An alternative way of expressing the fraction of particles remaining in the screen is in terms of the particle weight, which is given as follows:

$V(t) = \dfrac{W(t)}{W(0)} \,$	5

where $W(t)$ is the weight of a given size interval of particles remaining in the screen at any given time $t$ and $W(0)$ is the initial weight of the feed. Therefore, from equations (4) and (5), the screening rate can be expressed as:

$\dfrac{dW(t)}{dt} = \sigma _{t} ln(1-P) W(t) \,$	6

=== Separation efficiency ===
Screening efficiency can be calculated using mas weight in the following way E=c(f-u)(1-u)(c-f)/f(c-u)^2(1-f)

Apart from screening rate, another characteristic of interest is the separation efficiency of the trommel screen. Assuming that the size distribution function of the undersized particles to be removed, $f(x)$, is known, the cumulative probability of all particles ranging from $x_0$ to $x_m$ that are separated after $n$ impingements is simply:

$P(x_0,x_m) = \int_{x_0}^{x_m}f(x)\cdot(1-(1-p)^n)\,dx$	7

Furthermore, the total number fraction of particles within this size range in the feed can be expressed as follows:

$F({x_0},{x_m}) = \int\limits_{x_0}^{x_m}f(x)\ dx$	8

Therefore, the separation efficiency, which is defined as the ratio of the fraction of particles removed to the total fraction of particles in the feed, can be determined as follows:

$E(x_0,x_m) = \frac{P(x_0,x_m)}{F(x_0,x_m)}$	9

There are a number of factors that affect the separation efficiency of the trommel, which include:

1. Speed of rotation of the trommel screen
2. Feed rate
3. Residence time in the rotating drum
4. Angle of inclination of drum
5. Number and size of screen apertures
6. Characteristics of the feed

=== Residence time in the screen ===
Two simplifying assumptions are made in the equation presented in this section for the residence time of materials in a rotating screen. First, it is assumed that there is no slippage of particles on the screen. In addition, the particles dislodging from the screen are under free fall. When the drum rotates, particles are kept in contact with the rotating wall by centrifugal force. As the particles reach near the top of the drum, the gravitational force acting in the radial direction overcomes the centrifugal force, causing the particles to fall from the drum in a cataracting motion. The force components acting on the particle at the point of departure is illustrated in Figure 6.

The departure angle, α can be determined through a force balance, which is given as:

$\alpha = {\cos^{-1}}(\frac{r{\cdot}\omega^2_t}{g{\cdot}\cos\beta})$	10

where $r$ is the drum radius, $\omega _t$ is the rotational velocity in radians per second, $g$ is the gravitational acceleration and $\beta$ is the angle of inclination of the drum. Hence, the residence time of particles in the rotating screen can be determined from the equation below:

$t_r = \frac{L\cdot(360-4\alpha+229.2\cdot\cos\alpha\cdot\sin\alpha)}{48\cdot{n}\cdot{r}\cdot\tan\beta\cdot\cos\alpha\cdot(\sin\alpha)^2}$	11

where $L$ refers to the screen length, $n$ refers to the rotation of the screen in terms of revolutions per minute and $\alpha$ refers to the departure angle in degrees.

== Design and heuristics ==
Trommel screens are used widely in industries for its efficiency in material size separation. The trommel screening system is governed by the rotational velocity of the drum, mass flow rate of feed particles, size of the drum and inclination of trommel screen.

=== Particle rotational velocity behaviour ===
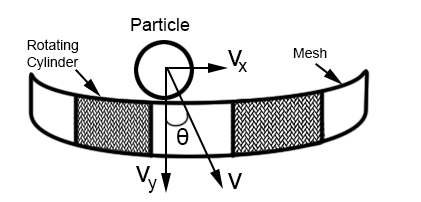
Figure 7: Relationship between the velocities and the sieve behaviour of particles

Considering the mesh sizes of the rotating drum are larger than particle sizes as shown in Figure 7, the particle motion velocity $V$ can be broken down into two velocity components consisting of the vertical component $V_y$ and horizontal component $V_x$ . Denoting $\theta$ to be the angle between the particle motion and vertical component, the vertical and horizontal velocities can now be written as:

$V_y = V\cos\theta$	12

$V_x = V\sin\theta$	13

When $V_y > V_x$, the particles escape through the mesh in the rotating drum. However, if $V_y < V_x$, the particles are retained within the rotating drum. Larger granules will be retained inside the trommel screen until the desired aperture is met and follows the same particle behaviour.

=== Particle motion mechanisms ===
With varying rotational velocities, the effect of screening efficiency and production rate varies according to different types of motion mechanisms. These mechanisms include slumping, cataracting and centrifuging.

==== Slumping ====
Figure 8: Slumping motion in a rotating drum

This occurs when the rotational velocity of drum is low. The particles are lifted slightly from the bottom of the drum before tumbling down the free surface as shown in Figure 8. As only smaller- sized filter granules near the wall of the trommel body are able to be screened, this results in a lower screening efficiency.

==== Cataracting ====
Figure 9: Cataract motion in rotating drum

As rotational velocity increases, slumping transitions to cataracting motion where particles detach near the top of the rotating drum as shown in Figure 9. Larger granules segregate near the inner surface due to the Brazil nut effect while smaller granules stay near the screen surface, thereby allowing smaller filter granules to pass through. This motion generates turbulent flow of particles, resulting in a higher screening efficiency compared to slumping.

==== Centrifuging ====
Figure 10: Centrifuging motion in rotating drum

As the rotational velocity increases further, cataracting motion will transition to centrifuging motion which will result in a lower screening efficiency. This is due to particles attaching to the wall of the rotating drum caused by centrifugal forces as shown in Figure 10.

=== Feed flow rate ===
According to Ottino and Khakhar, increasing the feed flow rate of particles resulted in a decrease in screening efficiency. Not much is known about why this occurs, however, it is suggested that this effect is influenced by the thickness of filter granules packed in the trommel body.

At higher feed flow rates, smaller-sized particles at the lower layer of the packed bed are able to be screened at designated apertures and remaining small-sized particles adhere to larger particles. On the other hand, it is easier for smaller-sized particles to pass through the granules thickness in the trommel system at lower feed rates.

=== Size of the drum ===
Increasing the area of material exposed to screening allows more particles to be filtered out. Therefore, features that increase the surface area will result in a much higher screening efficiency and production rate. The larger surface area can be increased by

- Increasing the length and diameter of the drum
- Increasing the size of the apertures and number of apertures
- Reducing the number of gaps/area between the apertures
- Using lifting bars to increase spread of particles

=== Inclination angle of drum ===
When designing the trommel screen, it should be taken into account that higher inclination angle would result in a higher production rate of particles. A higher inclination angle would result in a higher production rate due to an increase in particle velocity, $V$, as illustrated in Figure 7. However, this is at a cost of a lower screening efficiency. On the other hand, decreasing the inclination angle will result in a much longer residence time of particles within the trommel system which increases the screening efficiency.

Since screening efficiency is directly proportional to the length of the trommel, a shorter trommel screen would be needed at a smaller inclination angle to achieve a desired screening efficiency. It is suggested that the inclination angle should not be below 2° because the efficiency and production rate is unknown beyond this point. A phenomenon exist below 2° such that for a given set of operating conditions, decreasing the inclination angle will increase the bed depth resulting in a lower screening efficiency. However it will also simultaneously increase the residence time, which results in an increase in the screening efficiency. It is unsure which effect will be more dominant at inclination angles less than 2°.

== Example of post-treatment ==
In the wastewater treatment industry, the solids that exit the trommel will be compressed and dewatered as they travel along the conveyor. Most often a post-washing treatment such as a jet wash will be used after the trommel screen to break down faecal and unwanted semi-solid matter. The volume of the solid will decrease up to 40% depending on the properties before removal.
