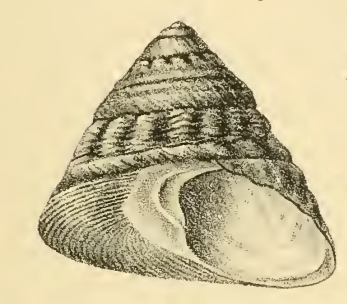
- Drawing showing an apertural view of a shell of Tegula pfeifferi

Scientific classification
- Kingdom: Animalia
- Phylum: Mollusca
- Class: Gastropoda
- Subclass: Vetigastropoda
- Order: Trochida
- Family: Tegulidae
- Genus: Tegula
- Species: T. pfeifferi

Binomial name
- Tegula pfeifferi (Philiippi, 1846)

Synonyms
- Chlorostoma achates Gould, 1861; Chlorostoma pfeifferi (Philippi, 1846); Trochus nordmanni Schrenck, 1862; Trochus pfeifferi Philippi, 1846 (original description)

= Tegula pfeifferi =

Species of gastropod

Tegula pfeifferi is a species of sea snail, a marine gastropod mollusk in the family Tegulidae. Tegula pfeifferi is more commonly known as "Pfeiffer's Top Shell".

== Description ==
The height of the shell is 30 mm, its diameter 33 mm. The solid, umbilicate shell has a conical shape with an acutely angled periphery. It is dark purplish or brownish-purple and obliquely striate; the base radiately striate or streaked with white. The elevated spire is strictly conical. The apex is eroded. The about 7 whorls are planulate above, the last acutely angular at the periphery. The whorls are smooth or with fine spiral striae, and ill-defined longitudinal folds. The base of the shell is smooth and obsoletely plano-concave. The subhorizontal aperture occupies about half the area of the base. The columella is dentate in the middle, expanded above in a white callus. The circular umbilicus is profound and surrounded by a white zone.

Tegula pfeifferi pfeifferi

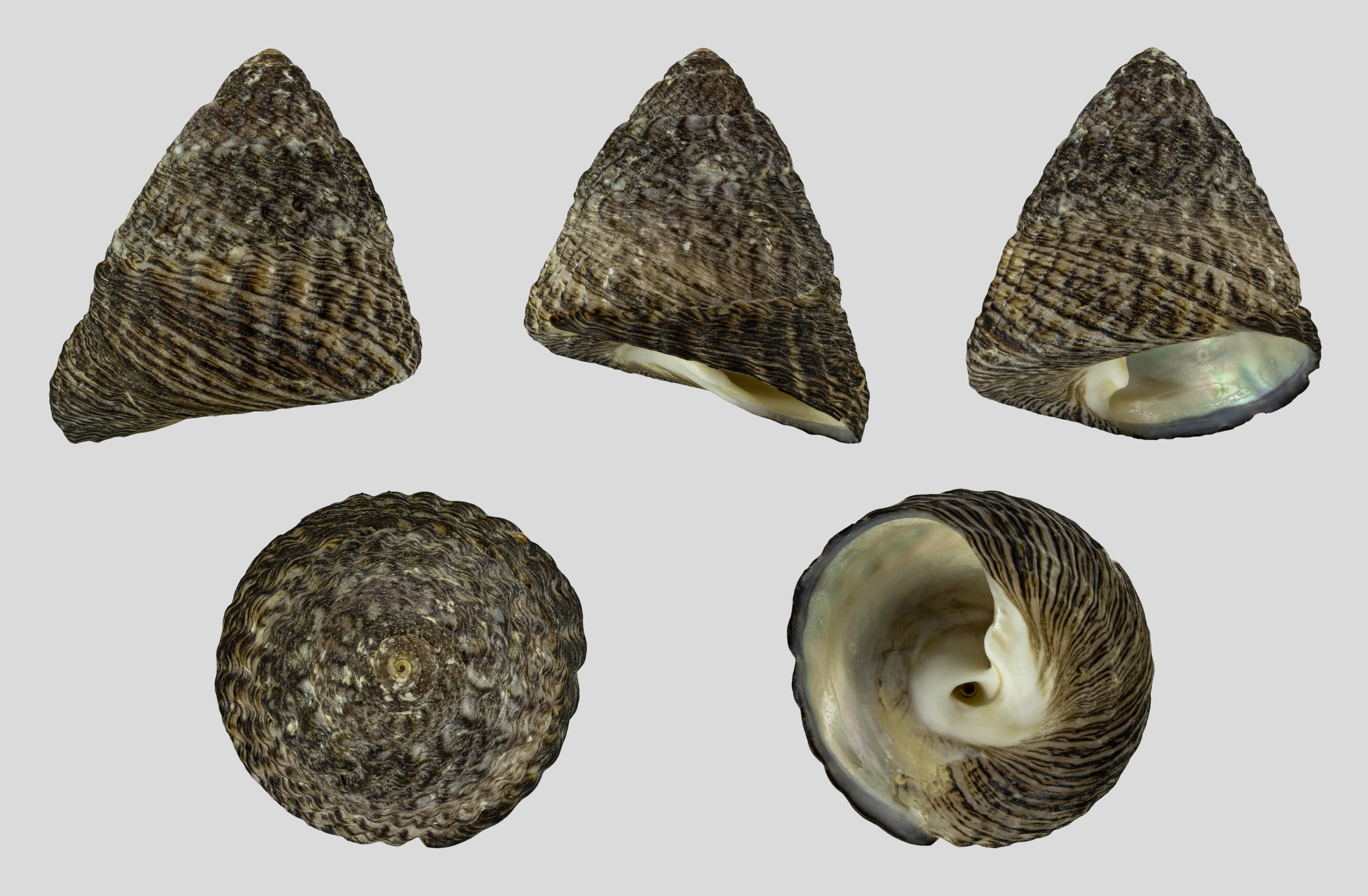
Tegula pfeifferi carpenteri

== See also ==
- Littorina littorea
