= Mechanical screening =

Separating granulated ore by particle size

Mechanical screening, often just called screening, is the practice of taking granulated or crushed material and separating it into multiple grades by particle size.

This practice occurs in a variety of industries such as mining and mineral processing, agriculture, pharmaceutical, food, plastics, and recycling.

A method of separating solid particles according to size alone is called screening.

== General categories ==
Screening falls under two general categories: dry screening, and wet screening. From these categories, screening separates a flow of material into grades, these grades are then either further processed to an intermediary product or a finished product. Additionally, the machines can be categorized into directly excited or indirectly excited screen machines, as well as by whether the screens are horizontal or inclined.

== Applications ==
Various industries use screening for a variety of processing applications. For example, after mining the minerals, the material is transported to a primary crusher. Before crushing large boulder are scalped on a shaker with 0.25 in (6.4 mm) thick shielding screening. Further down stream after crushing the material can pass through screens with openings or slots that continue to become smaller. Finally, screening is used to make a final separation to produce saleable products based on a grade or a size range.

== Process ==
A screening machine consist of a drive that induces vibration, a screen media that causes particle separation, and a deck which holds the screen media and the drive and is the mode of transport for the vibration.

There are physical factors that makes screening practical. For example, vibration, g force, bed density, and material shape all facilitate the rate or cut. Electrostatic forces can also hinder screening efficiency in way of water attraction causing sticking or plugging, or very dry material generate a charge that causes it to attract to the screen itself.

As with any industrial process there is a group of terms that identify and define what screening is. Terms like blinding, contamination, frequency, amplitude, and others describe the basic characteristics of screening, and those characteristics in turn shape the overall method of dry or wet screening.

In addition, the way a deck is vibrated differentiates screens. Different types of motion have their advantages and disadvantages. In addition media types also have their different properties that lead to advantages and disadvantages.

Finally, there are issues and problems associated with screening. Screen tearing, contamination, blinding, and dampening all affect screening efficiency.

== Physical principles ==
- Vibration - either sinusoidal vibration or gyratory vibration.
  - Sinusoidal Vibration occurs at an angled plane relative to the horizontal. The vibration is in a wave pattern determined by frequency and amplitude.
  - Gyratory Vibration occurs at near level plane at low angles in a reciprocating side to side motion.
- Gravity - This physical interaction is after material is thrown from the screen causing it to fall to a lower level. Gravity also pulls the particles through the screen media.
- Density - The density of the material relates to material stratification.
- Electrostatic Force - This force applies to screening when particles are extremely dry or is wet.

== Screening terminology ==
Like any mechanical and physical entity there are scientific, industrial, and layman terminology. The following is a partial list of terms that are associated with mechanical screening.

- Amplitude - This is a measurement of the screen cloth as it vertically peaks to its tallest height and troughs to its lowest point. Measured in multiples of the acceleration constant g (g-force).
- Acceleration - Applied Acceleration to the screen mesh in order to overcome the van der waal forces
- Blinding - When material plugs into the open slots of the screen cloth and inhibits overflowing material from falling through.
- Brushing - This procedure is performed by an operator who uses a brush to brush over the screen cloth to dislodged blinded opening.
- Contamination - This is unwanted material in a given grade. This occurs when there is oversize or fine size material relative to the cut or grade. Another type of contamination is foreign body contamination.
  - Oversize contamination occurs when there is a hole in the screen such that the hole is larger than the mesh size of the screen. Other instances where oversize occurs is material overflow falling into the grade from overhead, or there is the wrong mesh size screen in place.
  - Fines contamination is when large sections of the screen cloth is blinded over, and material flowing over the screen does not fall through. The fines are then retained in the grade.
  - Foreign body contamination is unwanted material that differs from the virgin material going over and through the screen. It can be anything ranging from tree twigs, grass, metal slag to other mineral types and composition. This contamination occurs when there is a hole in the scalping screen or a foreign material's mineralogy or chemical composition differs from the virgin material.
- Deck - a deck is frame or apparatus that holds the screen cloth in place. It also contains the screening drive. It can contain multiple sections as the material travels from the feed end to the discharge end. Multiple decks are screen decks placed in a configuration where there are a series of decks attached vertically and lean at the same angle as it preceding and exceeding decks. Multiple decks are often referred to as single deck, double deck, triple deck, etc.
- Frequency - Measured in hertz (Hz) or revolutions per minute (RPM). Frequency is the number of times the screen cloth sinusoidally peaks and troughs within a second. As for a gyratory screening motion it is the number of revolutions the screens or screen deck takes in a time interval, such as revolution per minute (RPM).
- Gradation, grading - Also called "cut" or "cutting." Given a feed material in an initial state, the material can be defined to have a particle size distribution. Grading is removing the maximum size material and minimum size material by way of mesh selection.
- Screen Media (Screen cloth) - it is the material defined by mesh size, which can be made of any type of material such steel, stainless steel, rubber compounds, polyurethane, brass, etc.
- Shaker - the whole assembly of any type mechanical screening machine.
- Stratification - This phenomenon occurs as vibration is passed through a bed of material. This causes coarse (larger) material to rise and finer (smaller) material to descend within the bed. The material in contact with screen cloth either falls through a slot or blinds the slot or contacts the cloth material and is thrown from the cloth to fall to the next lower level.
- Mesh - The number of open slots per linear inch. Mesh is arranged in multiple configuration. Mesh can be a square pattern, long-slotted rectangular pattern, circular pattern, or diamond pattern.
- Scalp, scalping - this is the very first cut of the incoming material with the sum of all its grades. Scalping is removing the largest size particles. This includes enormously large particles relative to the other particle's sizes. Scalping also cleans the incoming material from foreign body contamination such as twigs, trash, glass, or other unwanted oversize material.

== Types of mechanical screening ==
There are a number of types of mechanical screening equipment that cause segregation. These types are based on the motion of the machine through its motor drive.

- Circle-throw vibrating equipment - This type of equipment has an eccentric shaft that causes the frame of the shaker to lurch at a given angle. This lurching action literally throws the material forward and up. As the machine returns to its base state the material falls by gravity to physically lower level. This type of screening is used also in mining operations for large material with sizes that range from six inches to +20 mesh.
- High frequency vibrating equipment - This type of equipment drives the screen cloth only. Unlike above the frame of the equipment is fixed and only the screen vibrates. However, this equipment is similar to the above such that it still throws material off of it and allows the particles to cascade down the screen cloth. These screens are for sizes smaller than 1/8 of an inch to +150 mesh.
- Gyratory equipment - This type of equipment differs from the above two such that the machine gyrates in a circular motion at a near level plane at low angles. The drive is an eccentric gear box or eccentric weights.
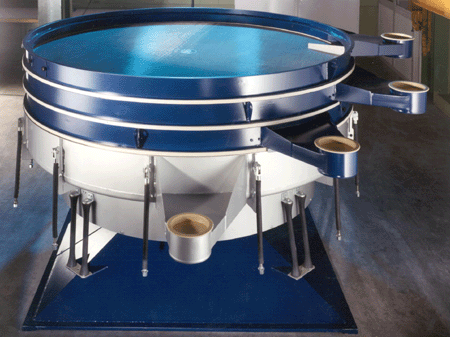
  Chemical Tumbler Screener
- Trommel screens - Does not require vibration. Instead, material is fed into a horizontal rotating drum with screen panels around the diameter of the drum.

=== Tumbler screening technique ===
An improvement on vibration, vibratory, and linear screeners, a tumbler screener uses elliptical action which aids in screening of even very fine material. As like panning for gold, the fine particles tend to stay towards the center and the larger go to the outside. It allows for segregation and unloads the screen surface so that it can effectively do its job. With the addition of multiple decks and ball cleaning decks, even difficult products can be screened at high capacity to very fine separations.

=== Circle-throw vibrating equipment ===
Circle-throw vibrating equipment is a shaker or a series of shakers as to where the drive causes the whole structure to move. The structure extends to a maximum throw or length and then contracts to a base state. A pattern of springs are situated below the structure to where there is vibration and shock absorption as the structure returns to the base state.

This type of equipment is used for very large particles, sizes that range from pebble size on up to boulder size material. It is also designed for high volume output. As a scalper, this shaker will allow oversize material to pass over and fall into a crusher such a cone crusher, jaw crusher, or hammer mill. The material that passes the screen by-passes the crusher and is conveyed and combined with the crush material.

Also this equipment is used in washing processes, as material passes under spray bars, finer material and foreign material is washed through the screen. This is one example of wet screening.

=== High frequency vibrating equipment ===
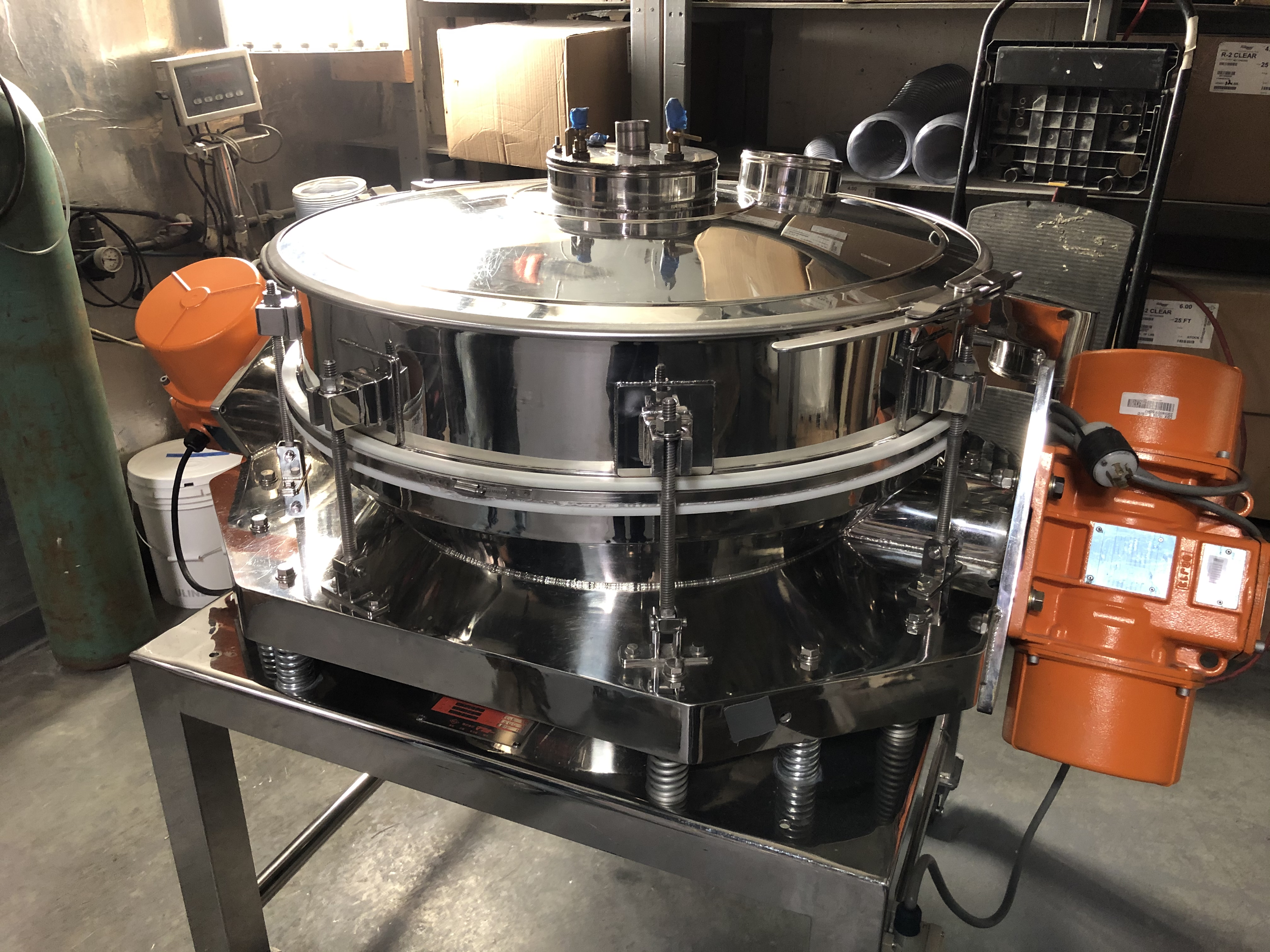
High Energy Screening Machine

High-frequency vibrating screening equipment is a shaker whose frame is fixed and the drive vibrates only the screen cloth. High frequency vibration equipment is for particles that are in this particle size range of an 1/8 in (3 mm) down to a +150 mesh. Traditional shaker screeners have a difficult time making separations at sizes like 44 microns. At the same time, other high energy sieves like the Elcan Industries' advanced screening technology allow for much finer separations down to as fine as 10um and 5um, respectively.

These shakers usually make a secondary cut for further processing or make a finished product cut.

These shakers are usually set at a steep angle relative to the horizontal level plane. Angles range from 25 to 45 degrees relative to the horizontal level plane.

=== Gyratory equipment ===
This type of equipment has an eccentric drive or weights that causes the shaker to travel in an orbital path. The material rolls over the screen and falls with the induction of gravity and directional shifts. Rubber balls and trays provide an additional mechanical means to cause the material to fall through. The balls also provide a throwing action for the material to find an open slot to fall through.

The shaker is set a shallow angle relative to the horizontal level plane. Usually, no more than 2 to 5 degrees relative to the horizontal level plane.

These types of shakers are used for very clean cuts. Generally, a final material cut will not contain any oversize or any fines contamination.

These shakers are designed for the highest attainable quality at the cost of a reduced feed rate.

=== Trommel screens ===
Trommel screens have a rotating drum on a shallow angle with screen panels around the diameter of the drum. The feed material always sits at the bottom of the drum and, as the drum rotates, always comes into contact with clean screen. The oversize travels to the end of the drum as it does not pass through the screen, while the undersize passes through the screen into a launder below.

== Screen media attachment systems ==
There are many ways to install screen media into a screen box deck (shaker deck). Also, the type of attachment system has an influence on the dimensions of the media.

=== Tensioned screen media ===
Tensioned screen cloth is typically 4 feet by the width or the length of the screening machine, depending on whether the deck is side or end tensioned. Screen cloth for tensioned decks can be made with hooks and are attached with clamp rails bolted on both sides of the screen box. When the clamp rail bolts are tightened, the cloth is tensioned or even stretched in the case of some types of self-cleaning screen media. To ensure that the center of the cloth does not tap repeatedly on the deck due to the vibrating shaker and that the cloth stays tensioned, support bars are positioned at different heights on the deck to create a crown curve from hook to hook on the cloth. Tensioned screen cloth is available in various materials: stainless steel, high-carbon steel and oil-tempered steel wires, as well as moulded rubber or polyurethane and hybrid screens (a self-cleaning screen cloth made of rubber or polyurethane and metal wires).

Commonly, vibratory-type screening equipment employs rigid, circular sieve frames to which woven wire mesh is attached. Conventional methods of producing tensioned meshed screens has given way in recent years to bonding, whereby the mesh is no longer tensioned and trapped between a sieve frame body and clamping ring; instead, developments in modern adhesive technologies has allowed the industry to adopt high-strength structural adhesives to bond tensioned mesh directly to frames.

=== Modular screen media ===
Modular screen media is typically 1 foot large by 1 or 2 feet long (4 feet long for ISEPREN WS 85) steel reinforced polyurethane or rubber panels. They are installed on a flat deck (no crown) that normally has a larger surface than a tensioned deck. This larger surface design compensates for the fact that rubber and polyurethane modular screen media offers less open area than wire cloth. Over the years, numerous ways have been developed to attach modular panels to the screen deck stringers (girders). Some of these attachment systems have been or are currently patented. Self-cleaning screen media is also available on this modular system.

== Types of screen media ==
There are several types of screen media manufactured with different types of material that use the two common types of screen media attachment systems, tensioned and modular.

=== Woven wire cloth (Mesh) ===
Woven wire cloth, typically produced from stainless steel, is commonly employed as a filtration medium for sieving in a wide range of industries. Most often woven with a plain weave, or a twill weave for the lightest of meshes, apertures can be produced from a few microns upwards (e.g. 25 microns), employing wires with diameters from as little as 25 microns. A twill weave allows a mesh to be woven when the wire diameter is too thick in proportion to the aperture. Other, less commonplace, weaves, such as Dutch/Hollander, allow the production of meshes that are stronger and/or having smaller apertures.

Today wire cloth is woven to strict international standards, e.g. ISO1944:1999, which dictates acceptable tolerance regarding nominal mesh count and blemishes. The nominal mesh count, to which mesh is generally defined is a measure of the number of openings per lineal inch, determined by counting the number of openings from the centre of one wire to the centre of another wire one lineal inch away. For example, a 2 mesh woven with a wire of 1.6mm wire diameter has an aperture of 11.1mm (see picture below of a 2 mesh with an intermediate crimp). The formula for calculating the aperture of a mesh, with a known mesh count and wire diameter, is as follows:

$a = \left ( \frac{25.4}{b} \right ) - c$

where a = aperture, b = mesh count and c = wire diameter.

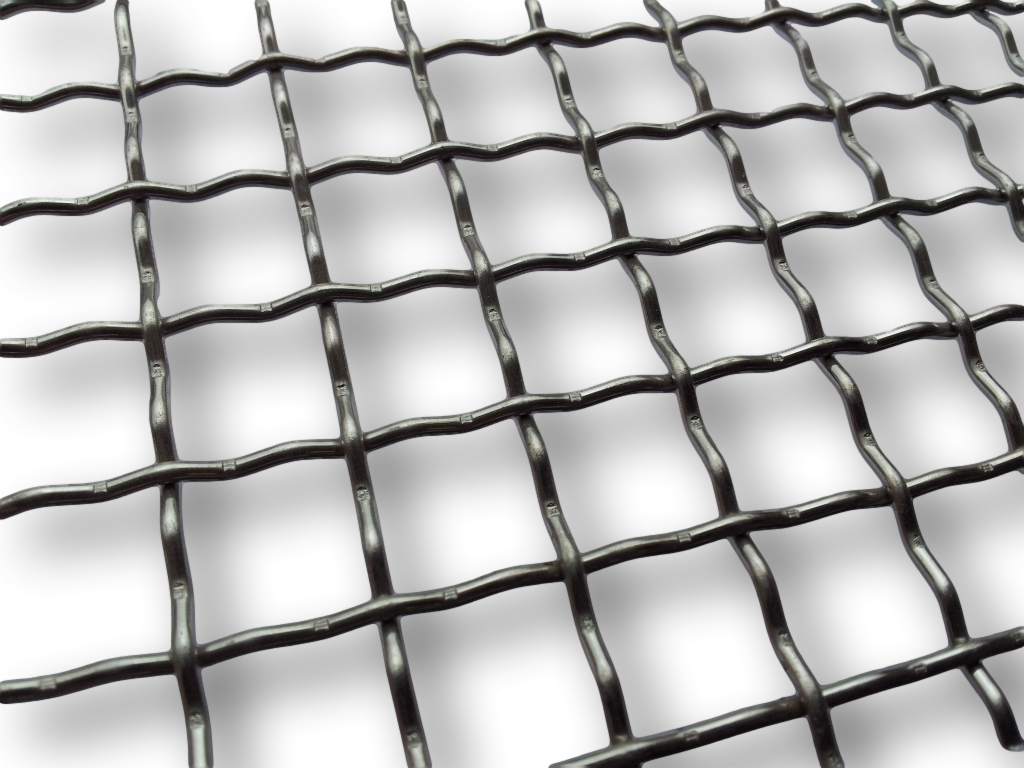
2 mesh with an intermediate crimp

Other calculations regarding woven wire cloth/mesh can be made including weight and open area determination. Of note, wire diameters are often referred to by their standard wire gauge (swg); e.g. a 1.6mm wire is a 16 swg.

Traditionally, screen cloth was made with metal wires woven with a loom. Today, woven cloth is still widely used primarily because they are less expensive than other types of screen media. Over the years, different weaving techniques have been developed; either to increase the open area percentage or add wear-life. Slotted opening woven cloth is used where product shape is not a priority and where users need a higher open area percentage. Flat-top woven cloth is used when the consumer wants to increase wear-life. On regular woven wire, the crimps (knuckles on woven wires) wear out faster than the rest of the cloth resulting in premature breakage. On flat-top woven wire, the cloth wears out equally until half of the wire diameter is worn, resulting in a longer wear life. Unfortunately flat-top woven wire cloth is not widely used because of the lack of crimps that causes a pronounced reduction of passing fines resulting in premature wear of con crushers.

=== Perforated and punch plate ===
On a crushing and screening plant, punch plates or perforated plates are mostly used on scalper vibrating screens, after raw products pass on grizzly bars. Most likely installed on a tensioned deck, punch plates offer excellent wear life for high-impact and high material flow applications.

=== Synthetic screen media (typically rubber or polyurethane) ===
Synthetic screen media is used where wear life is an issue. Large producers such as mines or huge quarries use them to reduce the frequency of having to stop the plant for screen deck maintenance. Rubber is also used as a very resistant high-impact screen media material used on the top deck of a scalper screen. To compete with rubber screen media fabrication, polyurethane manufacturers developed screen media with lower Shore Hardness. To compete with self-cleaning screen media that is still primarily available in tensioned cloth, synthetic screen media manufacturers also developed membrane screen panels, slotted opening panels and diamond opening panels. Due to the 7-degree demoulding angle, polyurethane screen media users can experience granulometry changes of product during the wear life of the panel.

=== Self-cleaning screen media ===
Self-cleaning screen media was initially engineered to resolve screen cloth blinding, clogging and pegging problems. The idea was to place crimped wires side by side on a flat surface, creating openings and then, in some way, holding them together over the support bars (crown bars or bucker bars). This would allow the wires to be free to vibrate between the support bars, preventing blinding, clogging and pegging of the cloth. Initially, crimped longitudinal wires on self-cleaning cloth were held together over support bars with woven wire. In the 50s, some manufacturers started to cover the woven cross wires with caulking or rubber to prevent premature wear of the crimps (knuckles on woven wires). One of the pioneer products in this category was ONDAP GOMME made by the French manufacturer Giron. During the mid 90s, Major Wire Industries Ltd., a Quebec manufacturer, developed a “hybrid” self-cleaning screen cloth called Flex-Mat, without woven cross wires. In this product, the crimped longitudinal wires are held in place by polyurethane strips. Rather than locking (impeding) vibration over the support bars due to woven cross wires, polyurethane strips reduce vibration of longitudinal wires over the support bars, thus allowing vibration from hook to hook. Major Wire quickly started to promote this product as a high-performance screen that helped producers screen more in-specification material for less cost and not simply a problem solver. They claimed that the independent vibrating wires helped produce more product compared to a woven wire cloth with the same opening (aperture) and wire diameter. This higher throughput would be a direct result of the higher vibration frequency of each independent wire of the screen cloth (calculated in hertz) compared to the shaker vibration (calculated in RPM), accelerating the stratification of the material bed. Another benefit that helped the throughput increase is that hybrid self-cleaning screen media offered a better open area percentage than woven wire screen media. Due to its flat surface (no knuckles), hybrid self-cleaning screen media can use a smaller wire diameter for the same aperture than woven wire and still lasts as long, resulting in a greater opening percentage.
