= Granular convection =

Movement in granular material

Unsolved problem in physics
What is the definitive explanation for why this phenomenon occurs?
More unsolved problems in physics

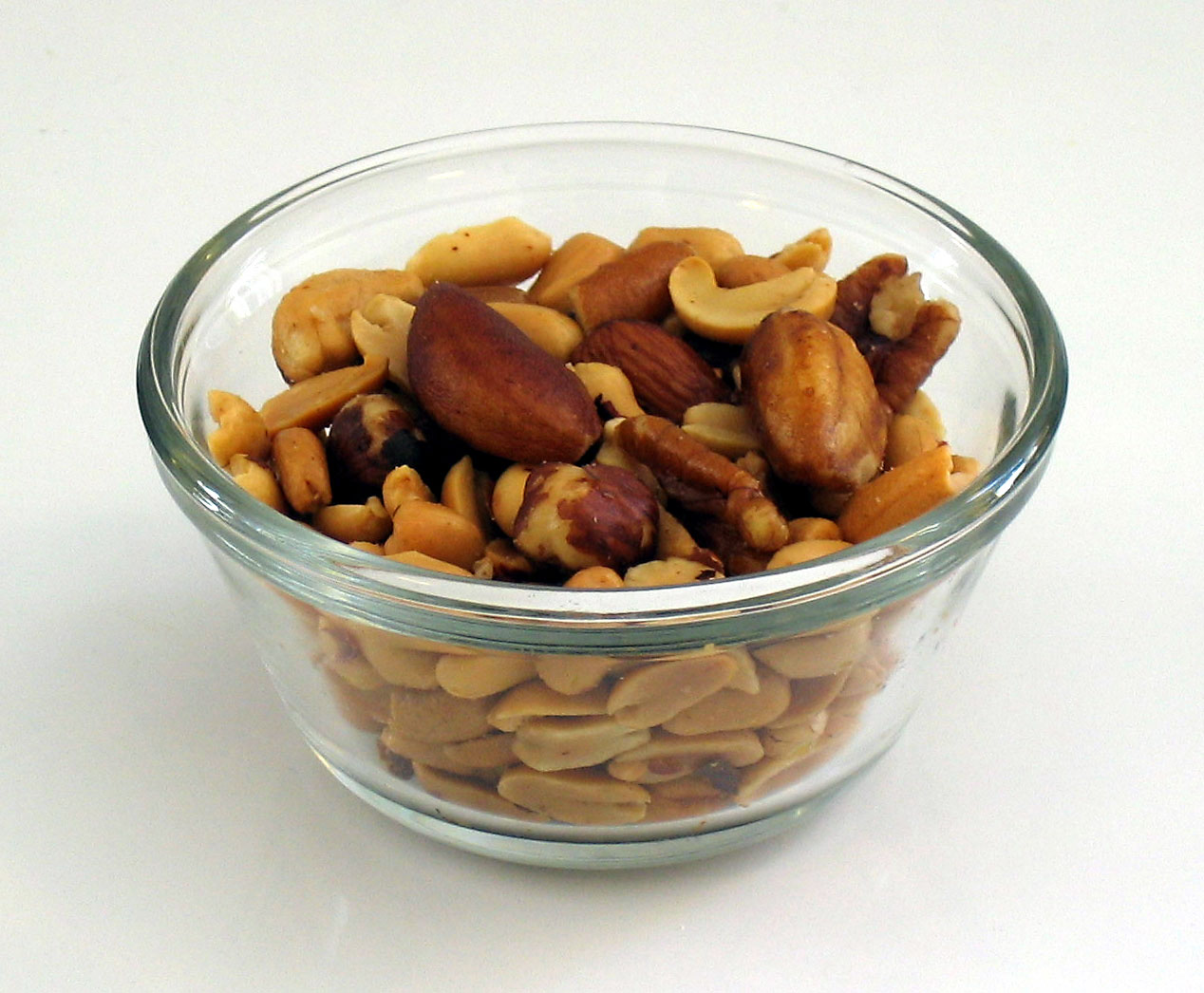
In a serving of mixed nuts, the larger Brazil nuts will often end up on the surface

A demonstration of the Brazil nut effect using a glass jar, a cup of rice, and a stack of coins serving as the intruder initially located at the bottom.

Granular convection is a phenomenon where granular material subjected to shaking or vibration will exhibit circulation patterns similar to types of fluid convection. It is sometimes called the Brazil nut effect, when the largest of irregularly shaped particles end up on the surface of a granular material containing a mixture of variously sized objects. This name derives from the example of a typical container of mixed nuts, in which the largest will be Brazil nuts.

Under experimental conditions, granular convection of variously sized particles has been observed forming convection cells similar to fluid motion.

== Explanation ==
A video demonstrating how shaking a bag of muesli causes the larger ingredients to rise to the surface

It may be counterintuitive to find that the largest and (presumably) heaviest particles rise to the top, but several explanations are possible:

- When the objects are irregularly shaped, random motion causes some oblong items to occasionally turn in a vertical orientation. The vertical orientation allows smaller items to fall beneath the larger item. If subsequent motion causes the larger item to re-orient horizontally, then it will remain at the top of the mixture.
- The center of mass of the whole system (containing the mixed nuts) in an arbitrary state is not optimally low; it has the tendency to be higher due to there being more empty space around the larger Brazil nuts than around smaller nuts. When the nuts are shaken, the system has the tendency to move to a lower energy state, which means moving the center of mass down by moving the smaller nuts down and thereby the Brazil nuts up.
- Including the effects of air in spaces between particles, larger particles may become buoyant or sink. Smaller particles can fall into the spaces underneath a larger particle after each shake. Over time, the larger particle rises in the mixture. (According to Heinrich Jaeger, "[this] explanation for size separation might work in situations in which there is no granular convection, for example for containers with completely frictionless side walls or deep below the surface of tall containers (where convection is strongly suppressed). On the other hand, when friction with the side walls or other mechanisms set up a convection roll pattern inside the vibrated container, we found that the convective motion immediately takes over as the dominant mechanism for size separation.")
- The same explanation without buoyancy or center of mass arguments: As a larger particle moves upward, any motion of smaller particles into the spaces underneath blocks the larger particle from settling back in its previous position. Repetitive motion results in more smaller particles slipping beneath larger particles. A greater density of the larger particles has no effect on this process. Shaking is not necessary; any process which raises particles and then lets them settle would have this effect. The process of raising the particles imparts potential energy into the system. The result of all the particles settling in a different order may be an increase in the potential energy—a raising of the center of mass.
- When shaken, the particles move in vibration-induced convection flow; individual particles move up through the middle, across the surface, and down the sides. If a large particle is involved, it will be moved up to the top by convection flow. Once at the top, the large particle will stay there because the convection currents are too narrow to sweep it down along the wall.
- The pore size distribution of a random packing of hard spheres with various sizes makes that smaller spheres have larger probability to move downwards by gravitation than larger spheres.

The phenomenon is related to Parrondo's paradox in as much as the Brazil nuts move to the top of the mixed nuts against the gravitational gradient when subjected to random shaking.

== Study techniques ==
Granular convection has been probed by the use of magnetic resonance imaging (MRI), where convection rolls similar to those in fluids (Bénard cells) can be visualized.

Other studies have used time-lapse CT scans, refractive index matched fluids, and positron emission tracing. On the lower-tech end of the scale, researchers have also used thin, clear plastic boxes, so that the motion of some objects is directly visible.

The effect has been observed in even tiny particles driven only by brownian motion with no external energy input.

== Applications ==
=== Manufacturing ===
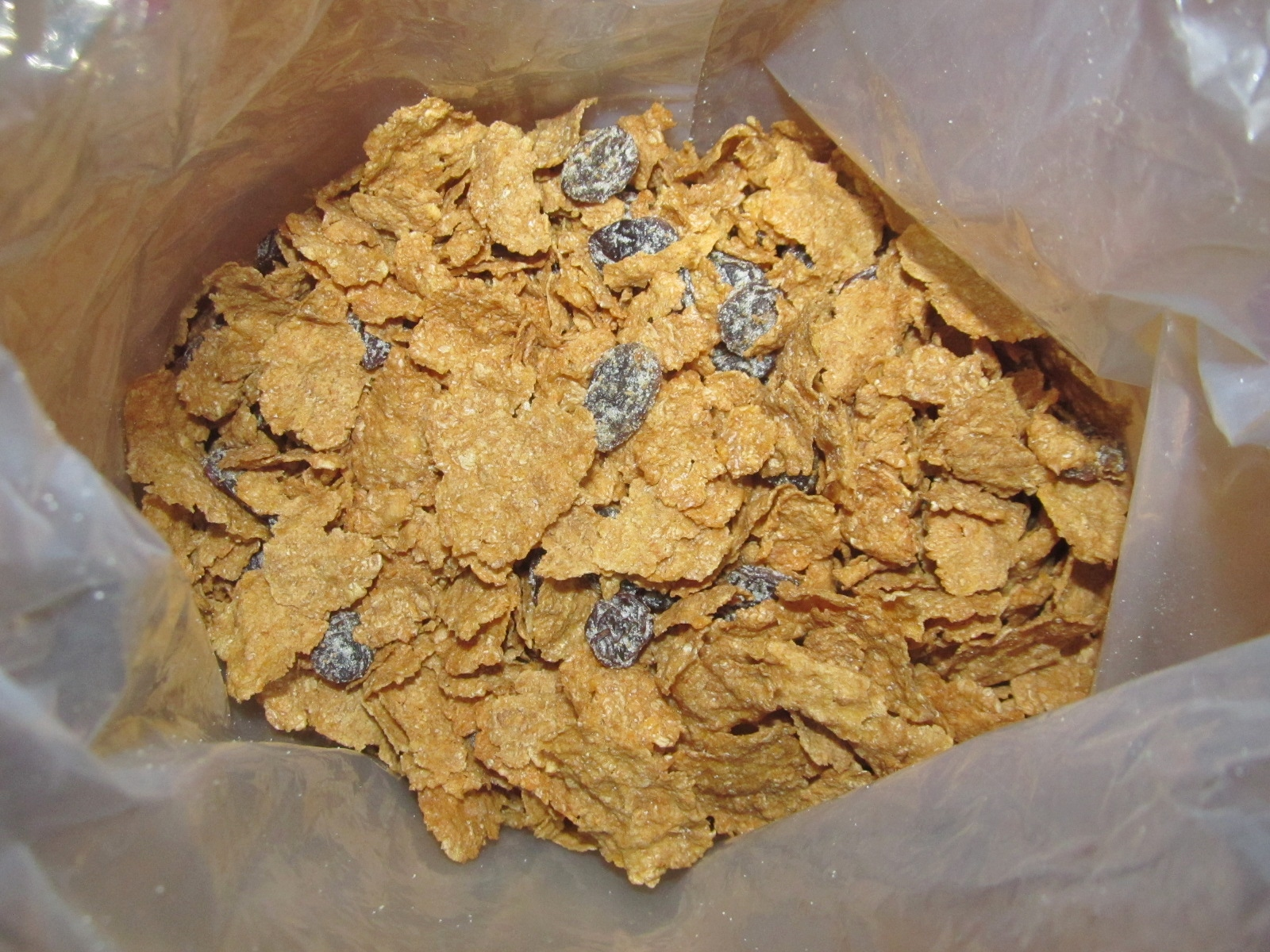
This phenomenon results in raisins tending to rise to the top of a box of breakfast cereal, so that the first servings of the cereal contain more raisins than usual, and only flakes are left at the bottom of the box.

The effect is of interest to food manufacturing and similar operations. Once a homogeneous mixture of granular materials has been produced, it is usually undesirable for the different particle types to segregate. Several factors determine the severity of the Brazil nut effect, including the sizes and densities of the particles, the pressure of any gas between the particles, and the shape of the container. A rectangular box (such as a box of breakfast cereal) or cylinder (such as a can of nuts) works well to favour the effect, while a container with outwardly slanting walls (such as in a conical or spherical geometry) results in what is known as the reverse Brazil nut effect.

=== Astronomy ===
In astronomy, it is common in low density, or rubble pile asteroids, for example the asteroid 25143 Itokawa and 101955 Bennu.

=== Geology ===
In geology, the effect is common in formerly glaciated areas such as New England and areas in regions of permafrost where the landscape is shaped into hummocks by frost heave — new stones appear in the fields every year from deeper underground. Horace Greeley noted "Picking stones is a never-ending labor on one of those New England farms. Pick as closely as you may, the next plowing turns up a fresh eruption of boulders and pebbles, from the size of a hickory nut to that of a tea-kettle." A hint to the cause appears in his further description that "this work is mainly to be done in March or April, when the earth is saturated with ice-cold water". Underground water freezes, lifting all particles above it. As the water starts to melt, smaller particles can settle into the opening spaces while larger particles are still raised. By the time ice no longer supports the larger rocks, they are at least partially supported by the smaller particles that slipped below them. Repeated freeze-thaw cycles in a single year speeds up the process.

This phenomenon is one of the causes of inverse grading which can be observed in many situations including soil liquefaction during earthquakes or mudslides. Liquefaction is a general phenomenon where a mixture of fluid and granular material subjected to vibration ultimately leads to circulation patterns similar to both fluid convection and granular convection. Indeed, liquefaction is fluid-granular convection with circulation patterns which are known as sand boils or sand volcanoes in the study of soil liquefaction. Granular convection is also exemplified by debris flow, which is a fast moving, liquefied landslide of unconsolidated, saturated debris that looks like flowing concrete. These flows can carry material ranging in size from clay to boulders, including woody debris such as logs and tree stumps. Flows can be triggered by intense rainfall, glacial melt, or a combination of the two.

== See also ==
- Cheerios effect
- Popcorn effect on high-frequency vibrating screens
