= Cheerios effect =

When floating objects attract each other

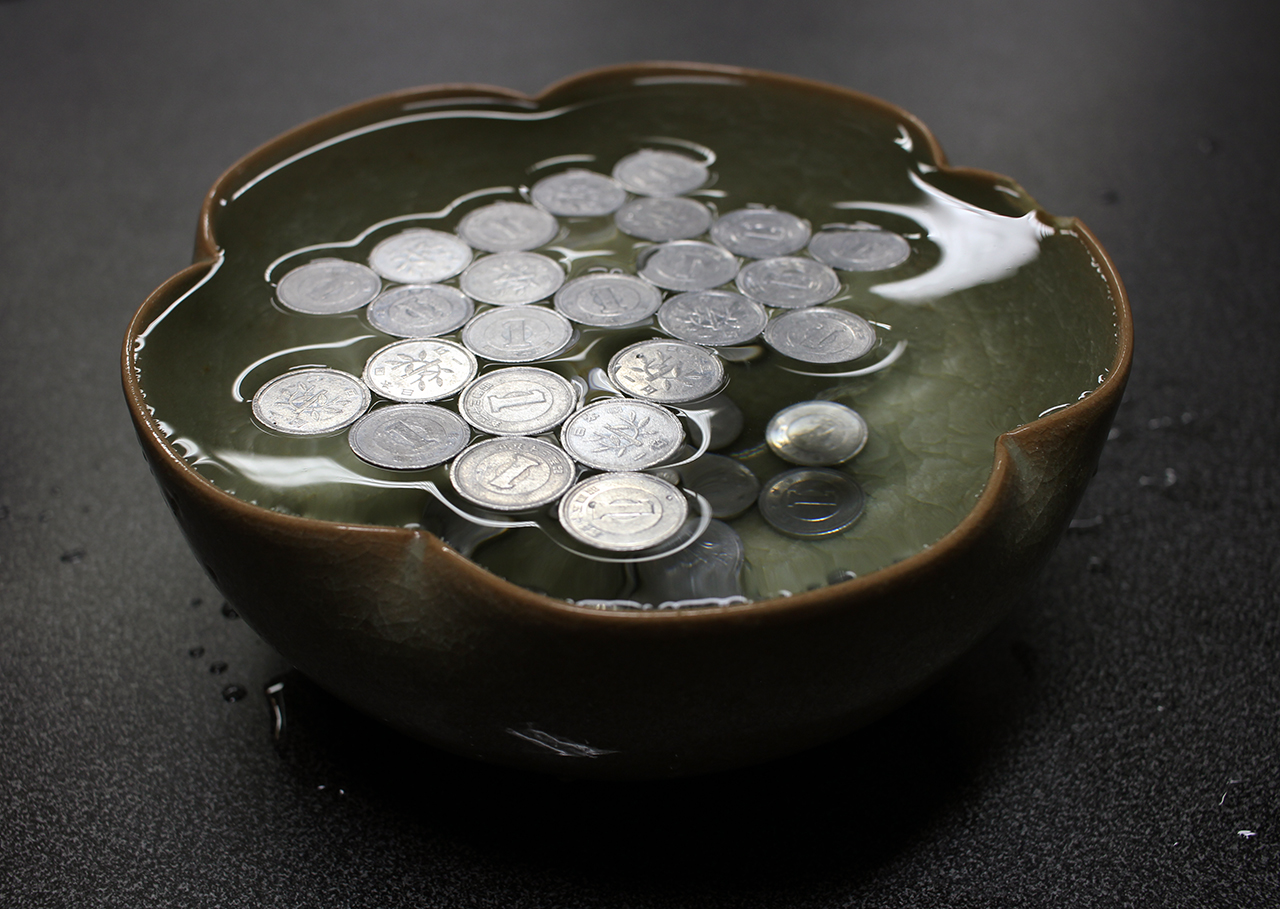
Demonstrating the Cheerios effect with coins. Light reflections reveal the curved water surface around the coins. Several coins have sunk to the bottom of the cup, showing that these coins normally do not float.

In fluid mechanics, the Cheerios effect is a colloquial name for the phenomenon of floating objects appearing to either attract or repel one another. The example which gives the effect its name is the observation that pieces of breakfast cereal (for example, Cheerios) floating on the surface of a bowl will tend to clump together, or appear to stick to the side of the bowl.

== Description ==
The effect is observed in small objects which are supported by the surface of a liquid. There are two types of such objects: objects which are sufficiently buoyant that they will always float on the surface (for example, Cheerios in milk), and objects which are heavy enough to sink when immersed, but not so heavy as to overcome the surface tension of the liquid (for example, steel pins on water). Objects of the same type will appear to attract one another, and objects of opposite types will appear to repel one another.

In addition, the same attractive or repulsive effect can be observed between objects and the wall of the container. Once again there are two possibilities: the interface between the liquid and the container wall is either a concave or a convex meniscus. Buoyant objects will be attracted in the case of a concave meniscus and repelled for convex. Non-buoyant floating objects will do the opposite.

== Explanation ==
All objects in a fluid experience two opposed forces in the vertical direction: gravity (determined by the mass of the object) and buoyancy (determined by the density of the fluid and the volume of liquid displaced by the object). If the buoyant force is greater than the force of gravity acting on an object, it will rise to the top of the liquid. On the other hand, an object immersed in a liquid which experiences a gravitational force greater than its buoyant force will sink.

At the surface of the liquid, a third effect comes into play: surface tension. This effect is due to the fact that molecules of the liquid are more strongly attracted to each other than they are to the air above the liquid. As such, non-wetting objects on the surface of the liquid will experience an upward force due to surface tension. If the upward force is sufficient to balance the force of gravity on the object, it will float on the surface of the liquid, while deforming the surface down. By contrast, objects with a net positive buoyancy will deform the water surface upward around them as they press against the surface.

This deformation of the liquid surface, combined with the net upwards or downwards force experienced by each object, is the cause of the Cheerios effect. Objects experiencing a net upward force will follow the surface of the liquid as it curves upward. Therefore two objects with an upward deformation will move toward each other as each follows the surface of the liquid upward. Similarly, objects with a net downward force will follow the curve of the liquid surface in the downward direction, and will move horizontally together as they do so.

The same principle holds at the side of the container, where the surface of the liquid is deformed by the meniscus effect. If the container is wetting with respect to the liquid, the meniscus will slope upwards at the wall of the container, and buoyant objects will move towards the wall as a result of travelling upward along the surface. By contrast, non-buoyant floating objects will move away from the walls of such a container for the same reason.

More complex behavior resulting from the same principles can be observed in shapes which do not have simple concave or convex meniscus behavior. When such objects come close to each other they rotate in the plane of the water surface until they find an optimum relative orientation then move toward each other.

== Simplified calculation ==
Writing in the American Journal of Physics, Dominic Vella and L. Mahadevan of Harvard University discuss the Cheerios effect and suggest that it may be useful in the study of the self-assembly of small structures. They calculate the force between two spheres of density $\rho_s$ and radius $R$ floating distance $\ell$ apart in liquid of density $\rho$ as

$$2\pi\gamma RB^{5/2}\Sigma^2K_1\left(\frac{\ell}{L_c}\right)$$

where $\gamma$ is the surface tension, $K_1$ is a modified Bessel function of the first kind, $B=\rho gR^2/\gamma$ is the Bond number, and

$$\Sigma=\frac{2\rho_s/\rho-1}{3}-\frac{\cos\theta}{2}+\frac{\cos^3\theta}{6}$$

is a nondimensional factor in terms of the contact angle $\theta$. Here $L_C=R/\sqrt{B}$ is a convenient meniscus length scale.
