= High-frequency vibrating screens =

Mineral processing machines

High-frequency vibrating screens are the most important screening machines primarily utilised in the mineral processing industry. They are used to separate feeds containing solid and crushed ores down to less than 200 μm in size, and are applicable to both perfectly wetted and dried feed. The frequency of the screen is mainly controlled by an electromagnetic vibrator which is mounted above and directly connected to the screening surface. Its high-frequency characteristics differentiate it from a normal vibrating screen. High-frequency vibrating screens usually operate at an inclined angle, traditionally varying between 0° and 25° and can go up to a maximum of 45°. They should operate with a low stroke and have a frequency ranging from 1500 to 9000 RPM. Frequency in high frequency screen can be fixed or variable. Variable high frequency screen is more versatile to tackle varied material condition like particle size distribution, moisture and has higher efficiency due to incremental increase in frequency. G-force plays important role in determining specific screening capacity of screen in terms of TPH per sqm. G-force increases exponentially with frequency.

Pre-treatment of the feed is often required before the use of the high-frequency screen, as the apertures in the screen may become blocked easily.

== Range of applications ==
High frequency screens have become more standardized and widely adopted in materials classification processes. They allow efficient cuts and fines separations, which can provide high purity and precise sizing control of the product (for sizes of fine particles up to 0.074–1.5mm). Common industrial applications include dewatering of materials, processing of powder in coal, ores and minerals, wood pelleting, fractionated reclaimed asphalt pavement, food, pharmaceutical and chemical industry. Fineness of the products and system capacities varies over a huge range between different models, to satisfy individual application requirements. It is also used effectively to process Manufactured sand for size segregation and removal of silt which is 75 microns below. For fine particle removal high G force is desirable and is achieved by higher frequency around 5000 to 6000 rpm.

=== Fractionated reclaimed asphalt pavement ===
Most commonly, high frequency screens are used to separate "reclaimed" asphalt pavement (RAP) into multiple sizes and fractions, which allow producers to take full advantage of the recycled materials. RAP is a recycle material that is reused in new pavement construction; any recycled products are worth as much as what they replace. As compared to conventional screening methods which are limited to producing unacceptable sizes in the products, high frequency screens can produce more efficient sizing to obtain a finer product. Another advantage of using high frequency screens to recycle the reclaimed materials is the available aggregate and oil that can be reused, and reducing the amount of new material required. Therefore, the capital cost for the process is lowered while maintaining a high quality of the asphalt mixture. Moreover, high frequency screen applies intensive vibration directly onto the screen media, such high RPM allows asphalt pavement material to achieve a higher stratification and separate at a faster rate.

=== Mineral processing ===
In mineral processing, such as metals ore (e.g. iron, tin, tungsten, tantalum etc.) and nonferrous metals ores (e.g. lead, zinc, gold, silver and industrial sand etc.), high frequency screens have a crucial role. After the ores get comminuted, high frequency screens are used as a classifier which selects materials size that is small enough to enter the next stage for recovery. For example, the closed grinding circuit (e.g. recirculating network with ball mill). Firstly, it screens out the coarse particles and recirculates them back to the grinding mill machine. Secondly, the fine-grained material will be unloaded in a timely manner, avoiding over-crushing caused by re-grinding. The benefits of using high frequency screens in mineral processing can meet the requirement of fineness easily for recovery and is able to achieve a smaller size separation, reducing capacity needed for comminution stage and overall energy consumption. Hence, improving the grade of the final product and providing a better recovery and screening efficiency.

== Advantages and limitations ==
The 'popcorn effect' during screening of minerals in high frequency vibrating screens

The high frequency vibrating screens achieves a high efficiency of separation and differs from its counterparts since it breaks down the surface tension between particles. Also the high level of RPMs contributes to increasing the stratification of material so they separate at a much higher rate. Separation cannot take place without stratification. Furthermore, since the screen vibrates vertically, there is a 'popcorn effect' whereby the coarser particles are lifted higher and finer particles stay closer to the screen, thus increases the probability of separation. In some high frequency vibrating screens the flow rate of the feed can be controlled, this is proportional to the 'popcorn effect'; if the flow rate lowers, the effect is also decreased. Limitations of the high frequency vibrating screen are that the fine screens are very fragile and are susceptible to becoming blocked very easily. Over time the separation efficiency will drop and the screen will need to be replaced.

An alternative to the high frequency vibrating screens is the rotary sifter. A rotary sifter uses a screen which rotates in a circular motion and the finer particles are sifted through the apertures. It is also generally used for finer separations; between 12mm to 45μm particle size. The rotary sifter will usually be chosen based on the nature of the substance being separated; whey, yeast bread mix, cheese powder, fertilizers. The rotary sifter is often preferred in the non-metallurgical industry and operates in a way to achieve a dust and noise free environment. The limitation for the rotary sifter is that it cannot handle a high capacity compared to the high frequency vibrating screen. Both equipment, however, achieve a high screening efficiency.

== Available designs ==
Conventional and general design for a high frequency vibrating screen consists of mainframe, screen web, eccentric bock, electric motor, rub spring and coupler. The two most common types of vibrators which induce the high frequency vibrations are hydraulic or electric vibrators, these electric vibrators are either electric motors or solenoids. Common designs for screening decks are either single or double deck. In addition, another feature of high frequency vibrating screens are the static side plates which provide benefits such as smaller support structure, less noise, longer life, and hence less maintenance. In industry, the screens are operated at a tilted angle up till 40 º. The high frequency (1500 – 7200 rpm) and low amplitude (1.2 – 2.0 mm) characteristics leads to the vertical-elliptical movement that rapidly transports oversized particles down the screen. Creating a thin bed of particles, this improves the efficiency and capacity of the screen.

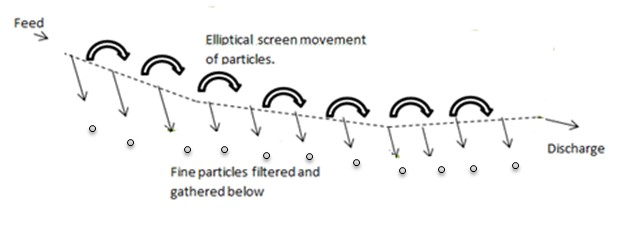
The movement pattern of a particle down a vibrating screen.

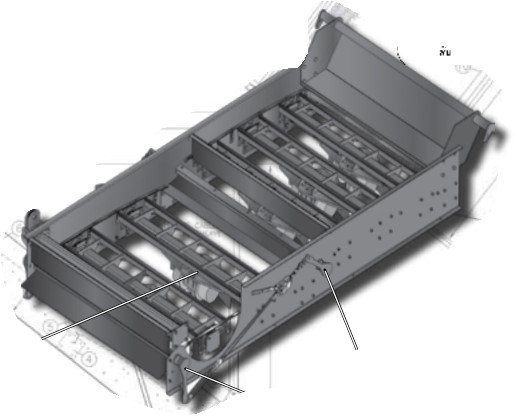
A mobile screening equipment with a single deck.

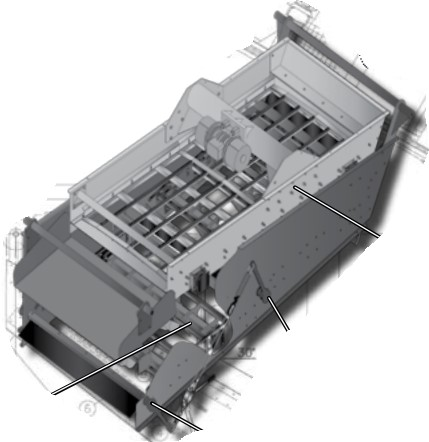
A mobile screening equipment with a double decker screen.

Stationary screens are typically used in plants and not moved around. In the mineral processing industry, equipment often has to be moved to different sites depending on the jobs taken up by a company. Mobile screens thus are another viable design for companies who have to move their equipment often. These include wheel-mounted and track-mounted plants which allow for easy transportation and movement of the screens. Typical mobile screen designs are shown in the diagrams on the right.

== Main process characteristics ==
The screening performance is affected significantly by various factors such as equipment capacity and angle of inclination, in which the performance can be measured by screening efficiency and flux of the product.

Flux is defined as the amount of a desired component (undersize material) that has carried over the screening media from the feed per time per unit area. Screening efficiency is expressed as the ratio of the amount of material that actually passes through the aperture, divided by the amount in the feed that theoretically should pass. Commercially perfect screening is considered to be 95% efficient if the process is operated with appropriate feed concentration and size particles. Generally, a suitable particle size difference between sieving and feed should be no more than 30%. High screening efficiency can reduce the qualified gain content in cyclic loading and screening and thus increasing the processing capacity of the mill.

The equipment capacity is almost directly proportional to screen width. This means that by increasing the length, there will be additional chances for passage, and will usually lead to increase in transmission and efficiency. In general, the standard size of screen length should be two to three times the width. However, certain special situations such as restricted space may require a different design.

Angle of inclination can be designed based on the desired mineral grain. For example, wet sieving angle is generally around 25 ± 2 ° for concentrator. Increasing the slope of a screen will effectively reduce the aperture by the cosine of the angle of inclination. At the same time, the materials also move across the screen faster which leads to more rapid stratification. However, the performance tends to decrease after a certain point since the slope of the deck is too high and most particles will remain on the oversized stream instead of passing through the aperture, thus, lower flux is yielded.

Table below presents relationship between inclined angle with desired product flux and efficiency.

Inclined Angle (°)	Flow Rate/Flux (m/min)	Efficiency (%)
18	18.29	86.4
20	24.39	54.6
22	30.48	62.8
25	36.58	64.2
30	32.37	67.5

== Characteristics assessment ==
=== Screen movement ===
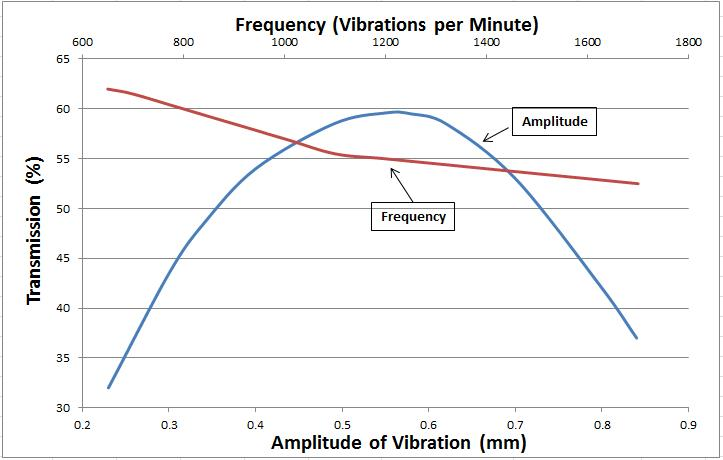
Dependence of screening efficiency on the amplitude and frequency of vibration

The purpose of the vibrating screen is that particles are introduced to the gaps in the screens repeatedly. The frequency of the screen must be high enough so that it prevents the particles from blocking the apertures and the maximum height of the particle trajectory should occur when the screen surface is at its lowest point. Based on the principle, there is an optimum frequency and amplitude of vibration

Transmission refers to the fraction of desired particle that passes through the apertures in the screen. At low frequency, screening efficiency is high but blinding is severe. Blinding will decrease as frequency increases but the particles will have difficulty going through the apertures. When designing a high frequency vibrating screen, an optimum point of frequency and amplitude must be chosen, depending on the specific applications.

=== Separation efficiency ===
The separation efficiency is simply a measure of the amount of material removed by the screen compared to the theoretical amount that should have been removed. Screen efficiency can be obtained using different equation, which depends on whether the desired product is the oversize or undersize fraction from the screen.

The screen efficiency based on the oversize (E_{o}) is given by:

$$E_o = \frac{Q_{ms}(o)\;[1-M_u(o)]}{Q_{ms}(f)\;[1-M_u(f)]}$$

The screen efficiency based on the undersize (E_{u}) is then given by:

$$E_u = \frac{Q_{ms}(u)\;M_u(u)}{Q_{ms}(f)\;M_u(f)}$$

where Q_{ms}(o) is the mass flow rate of solid in the screen overflow, Q_{ms}(f) is the mass flow rate of solid feed, Q_{ms}(u) is the mass flow rate of solid in the screen underflow, M_{u}(o) is the mass fraction of undersize in the overflow,
M_{u}(f) is the mass fraction of undersize in the feed, M_{u}(u) is the mass fraction of undersize in the underflow.

The overall efficiency (E) is given by:

$$E = E_o\;E_u$$

== Possible heuristics to be used during design of the process ==
In the process of sizing minerals there are often rules of thumbs that need to be followed in order to achieve maximum efficiency in the separation.

=== Screen selection ===
The selection on the screen type will be based on the materials that the equipment will be used to process. A significant problem occurs with screens because if the screen is not suitable for the material fed to the screen, the materials will blind the apertures and regular maintenance will be required. Different types of screens have been developed to counter this problem. An example is the "self-cleaning" wire; these wires are free to vibrate and so resistance to blinding will increase. The particles will be shaken off the wires and apertures. However, there will be a trade-off with screening efficiency.

=== Pre-treatment of feed ===
The high frequency vibrating screens will often be used as a secondary screener as its purpose is to separate the finer minerals. This not only ensures good separation efficiency, it will also help to maintain the life-time of the screen. Blinding can occur significantly if particle sizes are not within the screens' designed criteria.

Another problem that is often encountered is that the particles clump together due to moisture. This clumping will result in undesired increase in effective particle size, with the result that the clumped particles are not allowed to pass through the apertures into the product stream. It is recommended that screening at less than around 5mm aperture size is normally performed on perfectly dry materials. A heated screen deck may be used to evaporate the moisture in the feed. It will also break the surface tension between the screen wire and the particles. An alternative is to run the feed through a dryer before entering the high frequency vibrating screen.

== Post-treatment systems ==
High frequency vibrating screens are widely used in many industrial process, thus there will be high quantity of waste product released into the environment. It is important that these waste streams are treated, since the untreated waste will cause damage to the environment over a sustained period of time.

An established post-treatment system is classification processing. In this system, the waste streams are separated into different types of waste materials. The types of waste materials are classified into recyclable materials, hazardous materials, organic materials, inorganic materials. Generally, waste materials are separated using mechanical separation and manual separation. Mechanical separations are used for separating metals and other materials that may be harmful to the environment, and also to prepare the waste stream for manual separations. Manual separation have two types of sorting which are positive sorting and negative sorting. Positive sorting collects reusable waste such as recyclable and organic materials while negative sorting collects unusable waste such as hazardous and inorganic materials. After this separation process, the recyclable materials are transferred for reuse. The organic wastes are often treated using chemical processes (e.g. combustion, pyrolysis etc.) or biological treatment (microbial decomposition). The products obtained from these waste organic materials are in the form of refuse-derived fuel (RDF). RDF can be used in many ways to generate electricity or even used along with traditional sources of fuel in coal power plants. The rest of the hazardous and unwanted inorganic wastes are transferred to landfill to be disposed. These post-treatment processes are crucial to sustain the environment.

== New development ==
=== Screen improvements ===
The research on high frequency screens has led to new developments in the field which enhance the operation and performance of the equipment. These new developments include the stacking of up to 5 individual screen decks placed on top of the other and operating in parallel. A divider system splits the feed slurry to each Stack Sizer screen, then to each screen deck on the machine. Each screen deck has an undersize and oversize collection pan which will respectively go into their common outlet. The stacking of the machines thus allows more production while using less space. Another new development is the fabrication of Polyweb urethane screen surfaces that have openings as fine as 45 μm and open areas from 35% – 45%. This leads to the screen being able to separate finer particles. The screens can be used for both wet and dry applications and urethane formulation is still an ongoing process. Thus, research and development is still being invested in high frequency screening equipment to improve the overall separation efficiency and also to lower costs.

=== Mechanical part modifications ===
To further optimize the performance for high frequency vibrating equipment, a "variable speed" hydraulic vibrator is being developed and used to drive the screen decks. It utilizes fluid hydraulic force which then can be converted into rotary power in order to generate high frequency vibration. This modification allows equipment to operate at higher frequency range, up to 8200 RPM, compared to the conventional electric vibrators. Special Electric vibrator motors are also used to have variable frequency ranging from 3000 to 9000 rpm and have proved to be more efficient and trouble free with less maintenance. Besides that, the induced vibration also creates an excellent condition for separating finer particles and improves the contacting probability for the materials. Another variation that could be applied to the equipment is the "rotary tensioning system", in which it helps to provide a quicker screen media change. Therefore, multiple applications can be achieved by single equipment, as with different size of feed material can be deal by replacing screens in a very small downtime. Hence, it improves the economic benefits of plants. One important change is multi-slope deck in high frequency screen making it more efficient with incremental throughput and efficiency in same screening area.
