= Conus reticulatus =

Scientific classification
- Kingdom: Animalia
- Phylum: Mollusca
- Class: Gastropoda
- Subclass: Caenogastropoda
- Order: Neogastropoda
- Superfamily: Conoidea
- Family: Conidae
- Genus: Conus
- Species: C. reticulatus

Binomial name
- Conus reticulatus Born, 1778

Synonyms
- Lautoconus reticulatus (Born, 1778)

Species of gastropod

Conus reticulatus is a species of sea snail, a marine gastropod mollusk, in the family Conidae, the cone snails and their allies.
