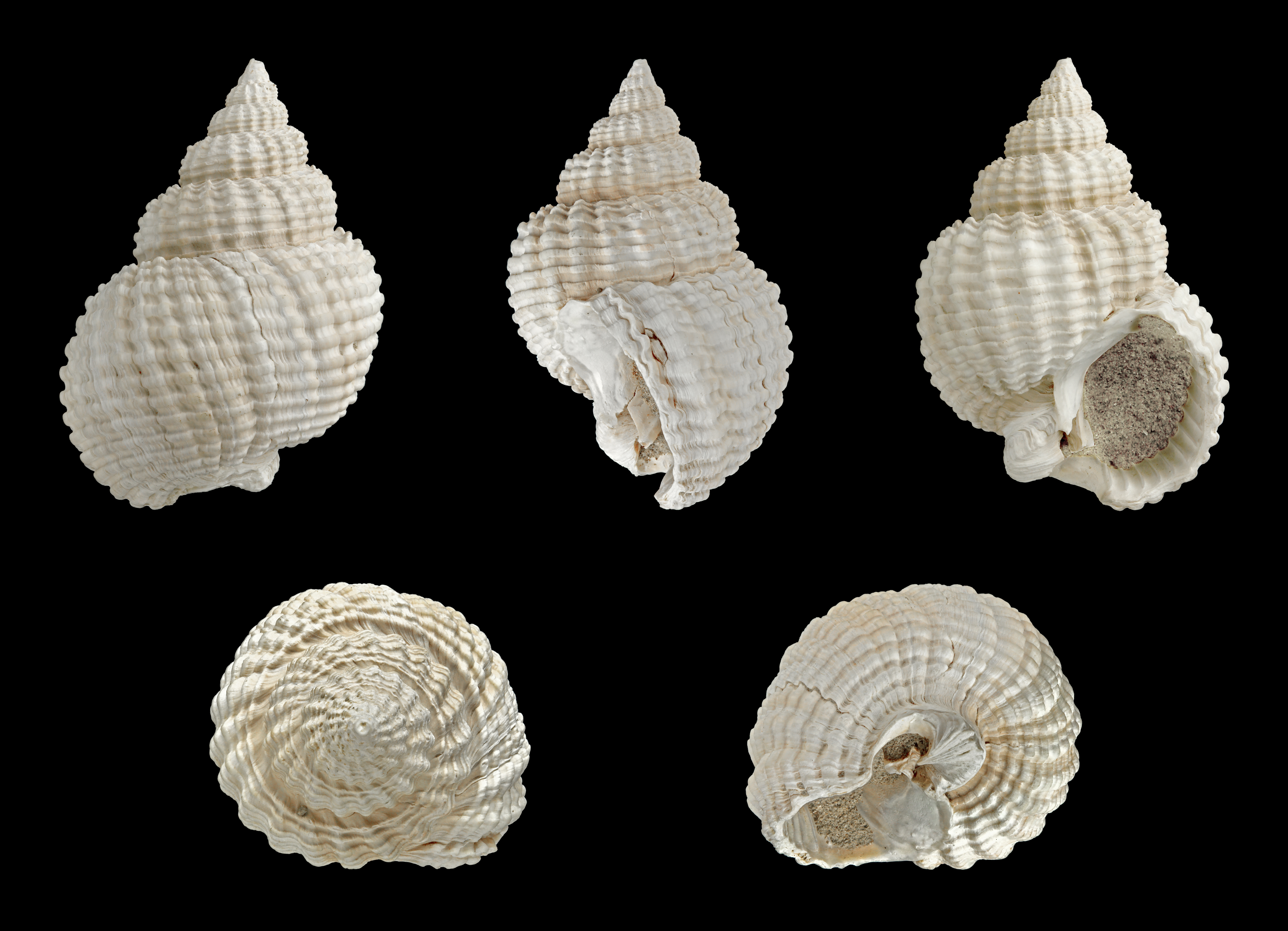

Scientific classification
- Kingdom: Animalia
- Phylum: Mollusca
- Class: Gastropoda
- Subclass: Caenogastropoda
- Order: Neogastropoda
- Family: Nassariidae
- Genus: Nassarius
- Species: N. clathratus

Binomial name
- Nassarius clathratus (Born, 1778)

Synonyms
- Buccinum clathratum Born, 1778 (original combination); Nassa ficaratiensis Monterosato, 1891; Nassa subclathrata d'Orbigny, 1852; Nassa turrita A. Adams, 1852

= Nassarius clathratus =

Species of gastropod

Nassarius clathratus, common name the clathrate nassa, is a species of sea snail, a marine gastropod mollusc in the family Nassariidae, the Nassa mud snails or dog whelks.

== Distribution ==
This species occurs in the Red Sea and in the Mediterranean Sea.
