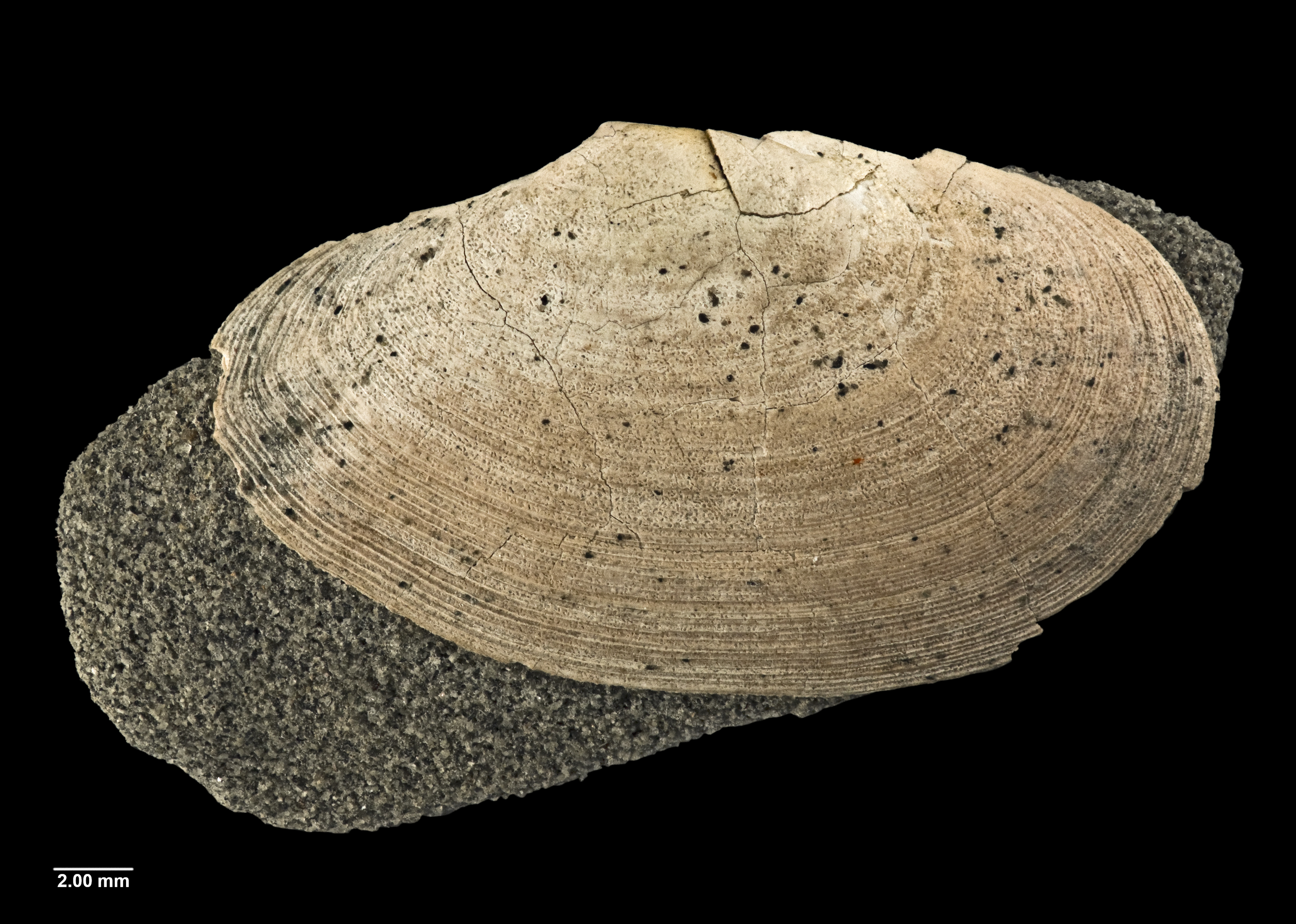
- Holotype from Auckland War Memorial Museum

Scientific classification
- Kingdom: Animalia
- Phylum: Mollusca
- Class: Bivalvia
- Order: Cardiida
- Family: Tellinidae
- Genus: Eurytellina
- Species: E. solitaria

Binomial name
- Eurytellina solitaria A. W. B. Powell, 1931

= Eurytellina solitaria =

Eurytellina solitaria Temporal range: 3.70 Ma

Species of bivalve

Eurytellina solitaria is a species of bivalve, a marine mollusc in the family Tellinidae. Fossils of the species date to the Waipipian stage (3.70 million years ago) of the late Pliocene in New Zealand, and are only known from fossil deposits from the coast of the South Taranaki Bight near Hāwera.

== Description ==
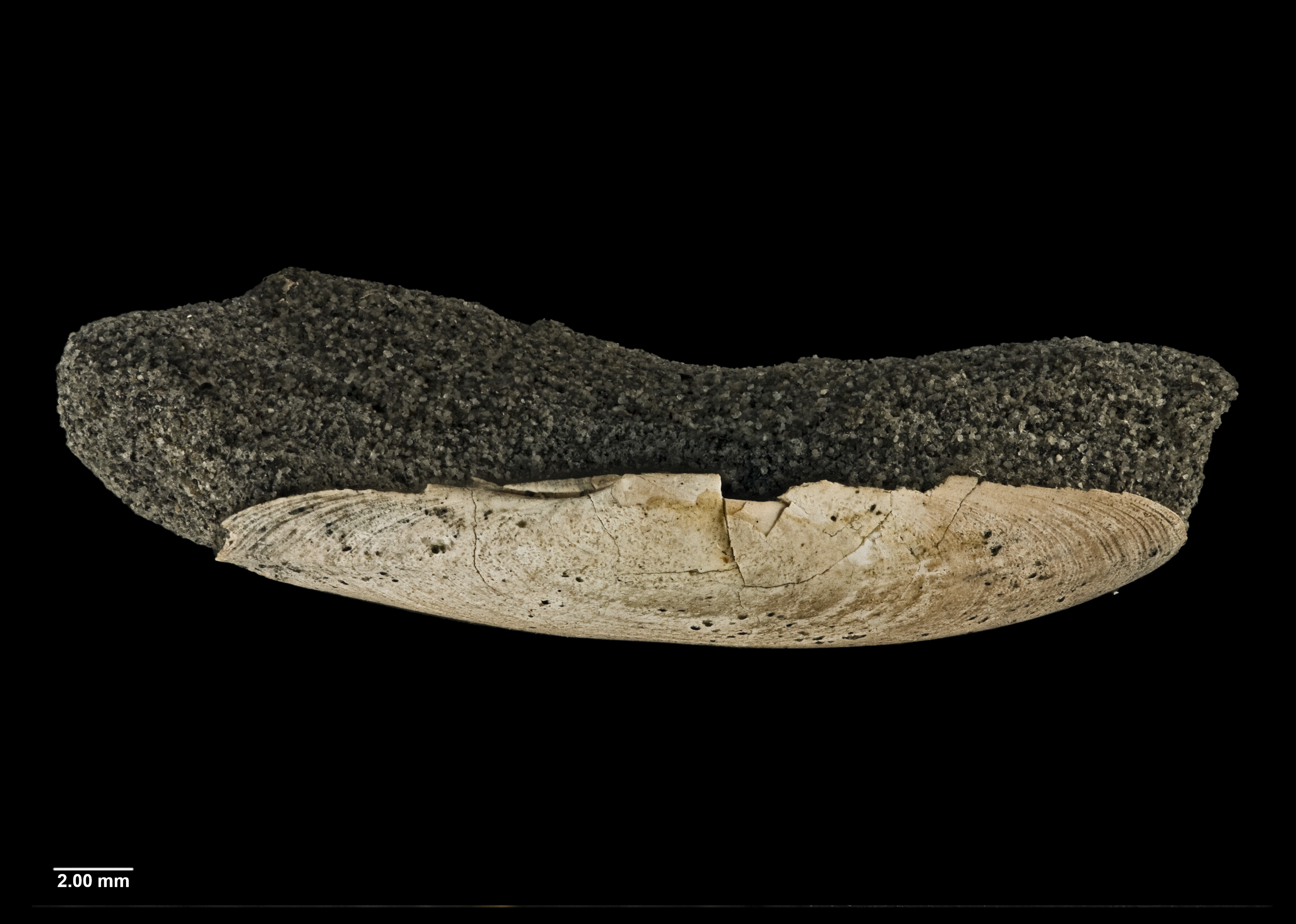
Side view of holotype

In the original description, Powell described the species as follows:

Shell of moderate size, compressed and elongate-oval in outline. Umbones at the posterior three-eighths. Rostrum rounded, situated at about half the height; with obsolete flexure, but having a narrow flattened area defined by a slight ridge, which runs from the umbo to the base of the rostrum. Sculpture of fine raised concentric threads, three to five per millimetre. Hinge badly damaged, but showing definite traces of a posterior lateral.

The holotype of the species has a height of 15 mm (0.59 in), a length of 26.5 mm (1.04 in), and a thickness of 3.0 mm (0.12 in) for a single valve.

== Taxonomy ==
The species was first described by A. W. B. Powell in 1931. Powell placed the species in the genus Eurytellina due to properties of the hinge, including the obsolete flexure, feeble concentric sculpture, presence of lateral teeth and elongate-oval outline, being similar to those of the extant American species E. punicea. Phillip A. Maxwell in 2009 noted that the species' inclusion in the genus was uncertain. The holotype was collected in January 1931 by Powell from the mouth of the Waihi Stream near Hāwera, South Taranaki. It is held in the collections of Auckland War Memorial Museum.

== Distribution ==
This extinct marine species occurs in the late Pliocene Waipipian stage (3.70 million years ago) in New Zealand, including the Tangahoe Formation.
