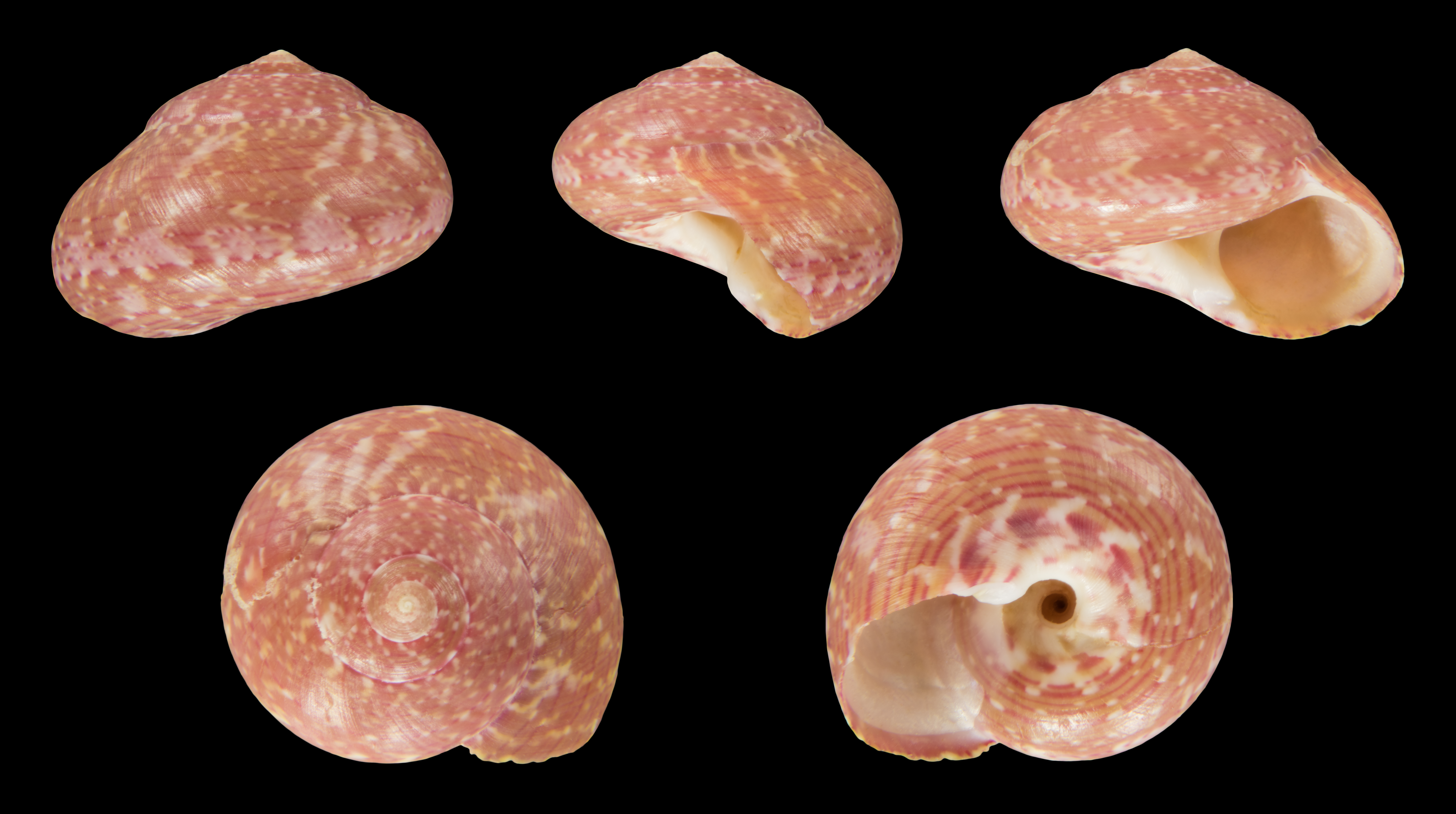
- Five views of a shell of Agathistoma fasciatum

Scientific classification
- Kingdom: Animalia
- Phylum: Mollusca
- Class: Gastropoda
- Subclass: Vetigastropoda
- Order: Trochida
- Superfamily: Trochoidea
- Family: Tegulidae
- Genus: Agathistoma
- Species: A. fasciatum

Binomial name
- Agathistoma fasciatum (Born, 1778)

Synonyms
- Adeorbis pictus Tenison Woods, 1877; Chlorostoma fasciata Born, 1778; Trochus carneolus Lamarck, 1822; Tegula fasciata (Born, 1778) ·; Trochus fasciatus Born, 1778; Trochus occultus Philippi, 1845; Turbo dentatus Gmelin, 1791

= Agathistoma fasciatum =

Species of gastropod

Agathistoma fasciatum (known commonly as the Smooth Atlantic Tegula) is a species of sea snail, a marine gastropod mollusk in the family Tegulidae.

== Description ==
A. fasciatum is slightly smaller than T. lividomaculata, which is 5/8 to 7/8 in (16 to 22 mm) high, and somewhat wider than that. Its thick, solid shell is depressed and is umbilicate. The six whorls are smooth, convex and rounded. The apex is acute. The upper whorls are nearly flat, the last flattened beneath the suture. The base of the shell is rounded, concave around the umbilicus. The aperture is oblique. The outer lip is finely crenulated within. The columella is short, arcuate, with a white callus above and two transverse tubercles at its base. The color of the shell is reddish or pale tan to dark brown, usually with irregular, axially distributed splotches of white, and fine spiral lines of alternating reddish and white spots or streaks. A pale band is often present at the periphery of the last whorl.

== Distribution ==
A. fasciatum often lives under rocks at low tide level, and is abundantly found throughout southern Florida, the Caribbean Sea and the West Indies (Atlantic Ocean) at depths between 0 m and 90 m.
