= Conus fuscatus =

Scientific classification
- Kingdom: Animalia
- Phylum: Mollusca
- Class: Gastropoda
- Subclass: Caenogastropoda
- Order: Neogastropoda
- Superfamily: Conoidea
- Family: Conidae
- Genus: Conus
- Species: C. fuscatus

Binomial name
- Conus fuscatus Born, 1778

Synonyms
- Conus (Stephanoconus) fuscatus Born, 1778

Species of gastropod

Conus fuscatus is a species of sea snail, a marine gastropod mollusk, in the family Conidae, the cone snails and their allies.

== Distribution ==
This species occurs in the following locations:

- Mascarene Basin
- Mauritius
