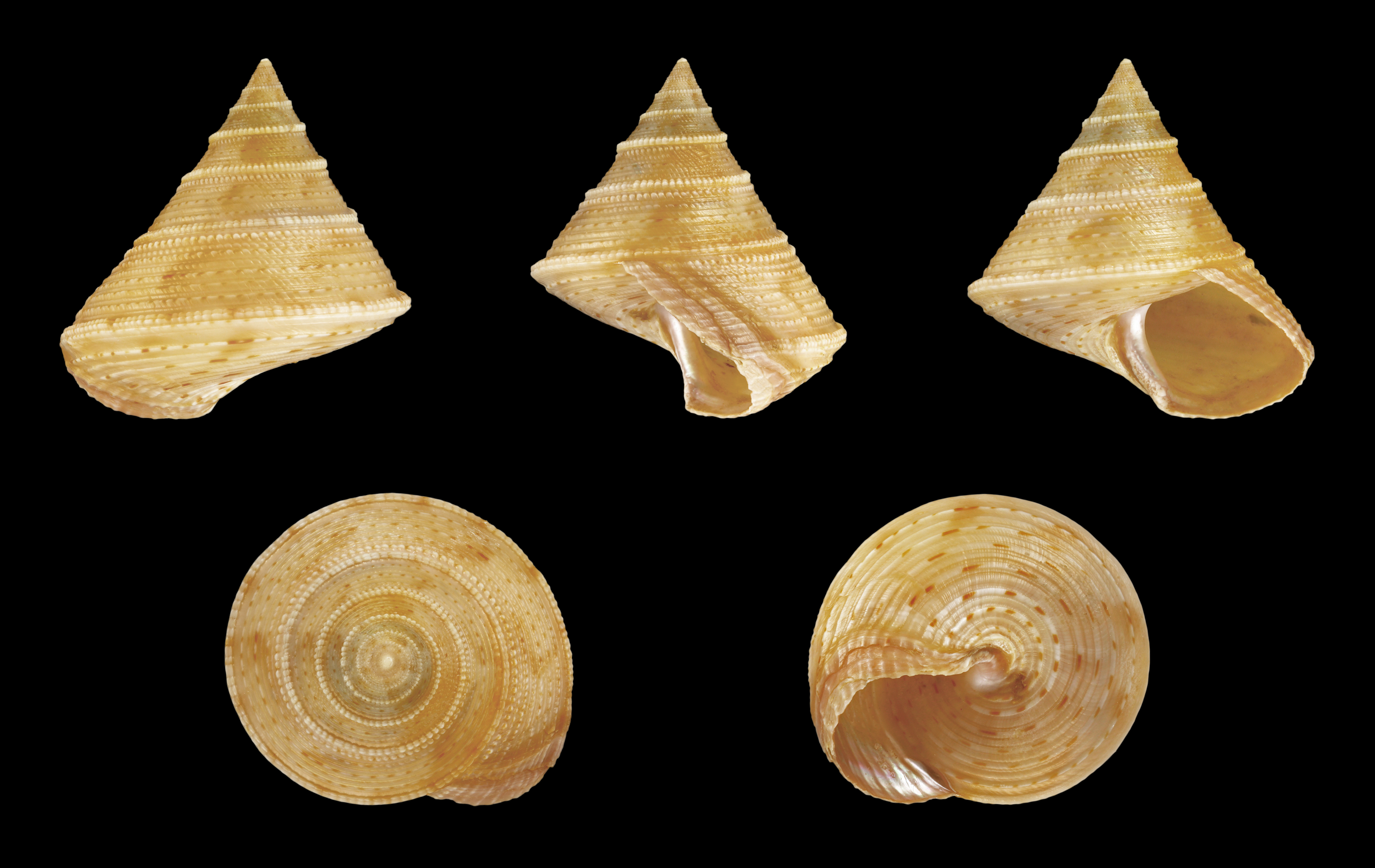
- Shell of Calliostoma granulatum

Scientific classification
- Kingdom: Animalia
- Phylum: Mollusca
- Class: Gastropoda
- Subclass: Vetigastropoda
- Order: Trochida
- Family: Calliostomatidae
- Genus: Calliostoma
- Species: C. granulatum

Binomial name
- Calliostoma granulatum (Born, 1778)

Synonyms
- Calliostoma papillosa (Da Costa, 1778); Trochus fragilis Pulteney (not Gmel.); Trochus papillosum Da Costa, 1778; Ziziphinus granulatus Brusina

= Calliostoma granulatum =

Species of gastropod

Calliostoma granulatum, common name the European granular top shell, is a species of sea snail, a marine gastropod mollusk in the family Calliostomatidae.

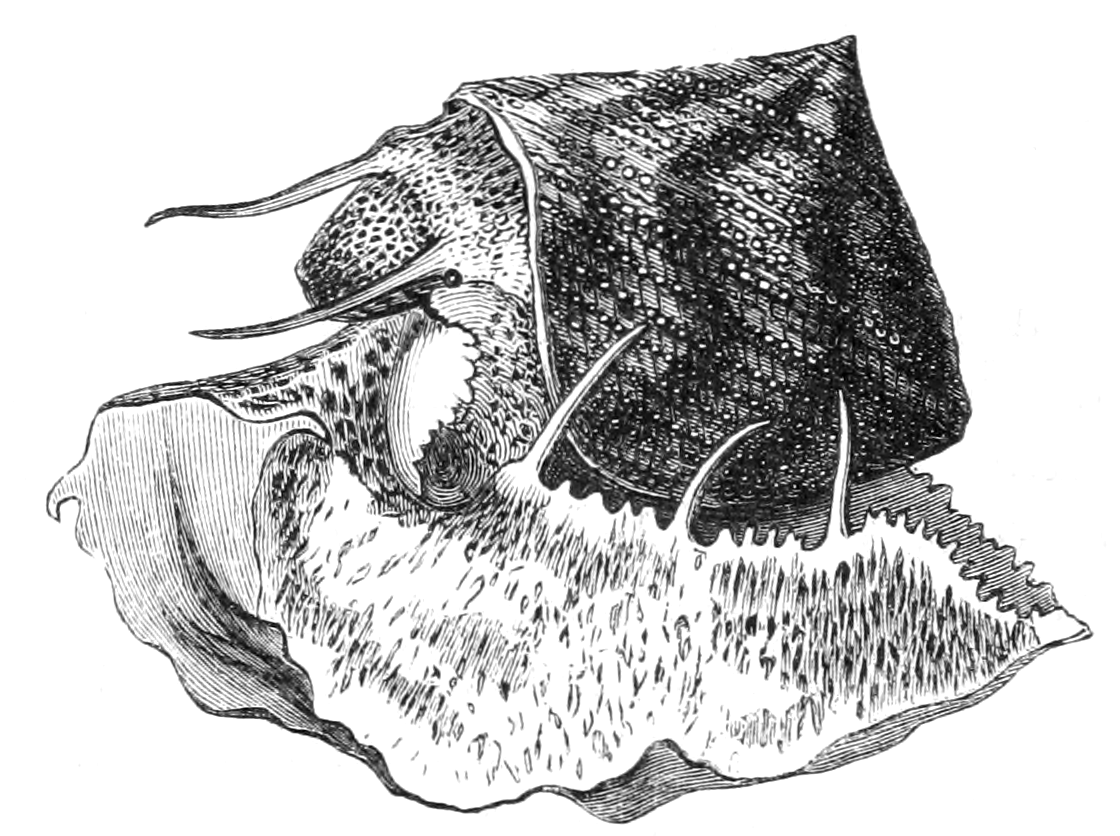
Illustration of Calliostoma granulatum from Natural History: Mollusca (1854)

Some authors place this taxon in the subgenus Calliostoma (Maurea).

== Description ==
The height of the shell varies between 18 and 35 mm (0.71 and 1.38 in). The thin, light and acutely conical shell is imperforate. It is corneous or flesh-colored, more rarely rich orange, unicolored or sparsely articulated on the basal rilblets with rich brown, and frequently with rather obscure clouded niaculations of pale brown above. The surface is shining, closely sculptured by numerous narrow threads or riblets, which on the spire are contiguous, finely, regularly beaded. They become more separated on the body whorl. The interstices are obliquely striate. The spiral riblets are either granulate or nearly smooth. The base of the shell shows numerous concentric lirulae that are granose or nearly smooth. Their interstices are radiately striate. The elevated spire is slender, its outlines concave. The apex is minute. The apical whorl is smooth and rounded. The suture is linear. Its position is marked by a slightly prominent double granose cingulus above it. There are about eight, flat whorls. The last one is strongly angular at the periphery and convex beneath. The aperture is subquadrate and finely sulcate inside. The subvertical columella is arcuate and cylindrical.

== Distribution ==
This marine species occurs in the Atlantic Ocean from Shetland to the Azores, Madeira and the Canary Islands; in the Western Mediterranean Sea and the Adriatic Sea.
