= Argopecten eboreus yorkensis =

Scientific classification
- Domain: Eukaryota
- Kingdom: Animalia
- Phylum: Mollusca
- Class: Bivalvia
- Order: Pectinida
- Family: Pectinidae
- Genus: Argopecten
- Species: A. eboreus
- Subspecies: †A. e. yorkensis

Trinomial name
- †Argopecten eboreus yorkensis Conrad 1867

Synonyms
- †Pecten yorkensis

Extinct subspecies of bivalve

Argopecten eboreus yorkensis is a fossil scallop, an extinct subspecies of marine bivalve mollusks in the family Pectinidae, the scallops.
