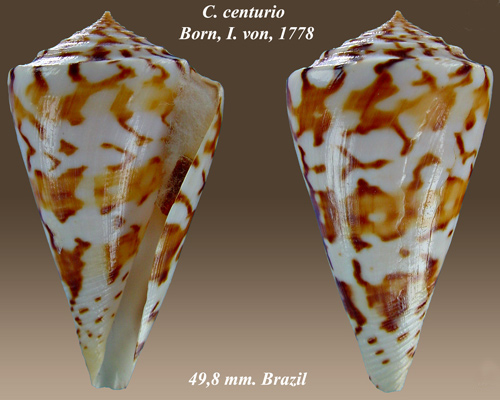
- Apertural and abapertural views of shell of Conasprella centurio (Born, I. von, 1778)
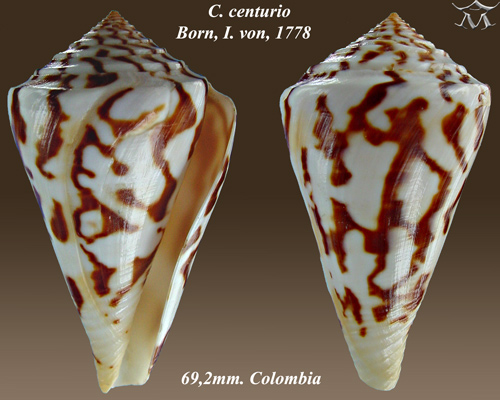

Conservation status
- Least Concern (IUCN 3.1)

Scientific classification
- Kingdom: Animalia
- Phylum: Mollusca
- Class: Gastropoda
- Subclass: Caenogastropoda
- Order: Neogastropoda
- Superfamily: Conoidea
- Family: Conidae
- Genus: Conasprella
- Species: C. centurio

Binomial name
- Conasprella centurio (Born, 1778)

Synonyms
- Conasprella (Kohniconus) centurio (Born, 1778) · accepted, alternate representation; Conus bifasciatus Gmelin, 1791; Conus centurio Born, 1778 (original combination); Conus centurio f. caribaensis Nowell-Usticke, 1968; Conus centurio f. cruzensis Nowell-Usticke, 1968; Conus centurio var. antillensis Sander, 1982; Conus tribunus Gmelin, 1791; Conus woolseyi M. Smith, 1946; Kohniconus centurio (Born, 1778)

= Conasprella centurio =

Species of gastropod

Conasprella centurio is a species of sea snail, a marine gastropod mollusk in the family Conidae, the cone snails and their allies.

Like all species within the genus Conasprella, these cone snails are predatory and venomous. They are capable of stinging humans, therefore live ones should be handled carefully or not at all.

== Distribution ==
Locus typicus: (designated by Clench) - Puerto Plata, Santo Domingo, (Dominican Republic).

A Western Atlantic species known from the continental shelf of Guyana and Northern South America and from Monos Isl. Trinidad, also from St.Vincent and Barbados, in the Lesser Antilles.

== Description ==
The maximum recorded shell length is 85.5 mm.

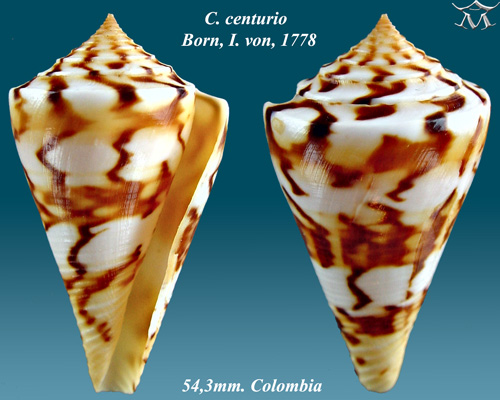
Conus centurio Born, I. von, 1778

== Habitat ==
Minimum recorded depth is 2 m. Maximum recorded depth is 175 m.
