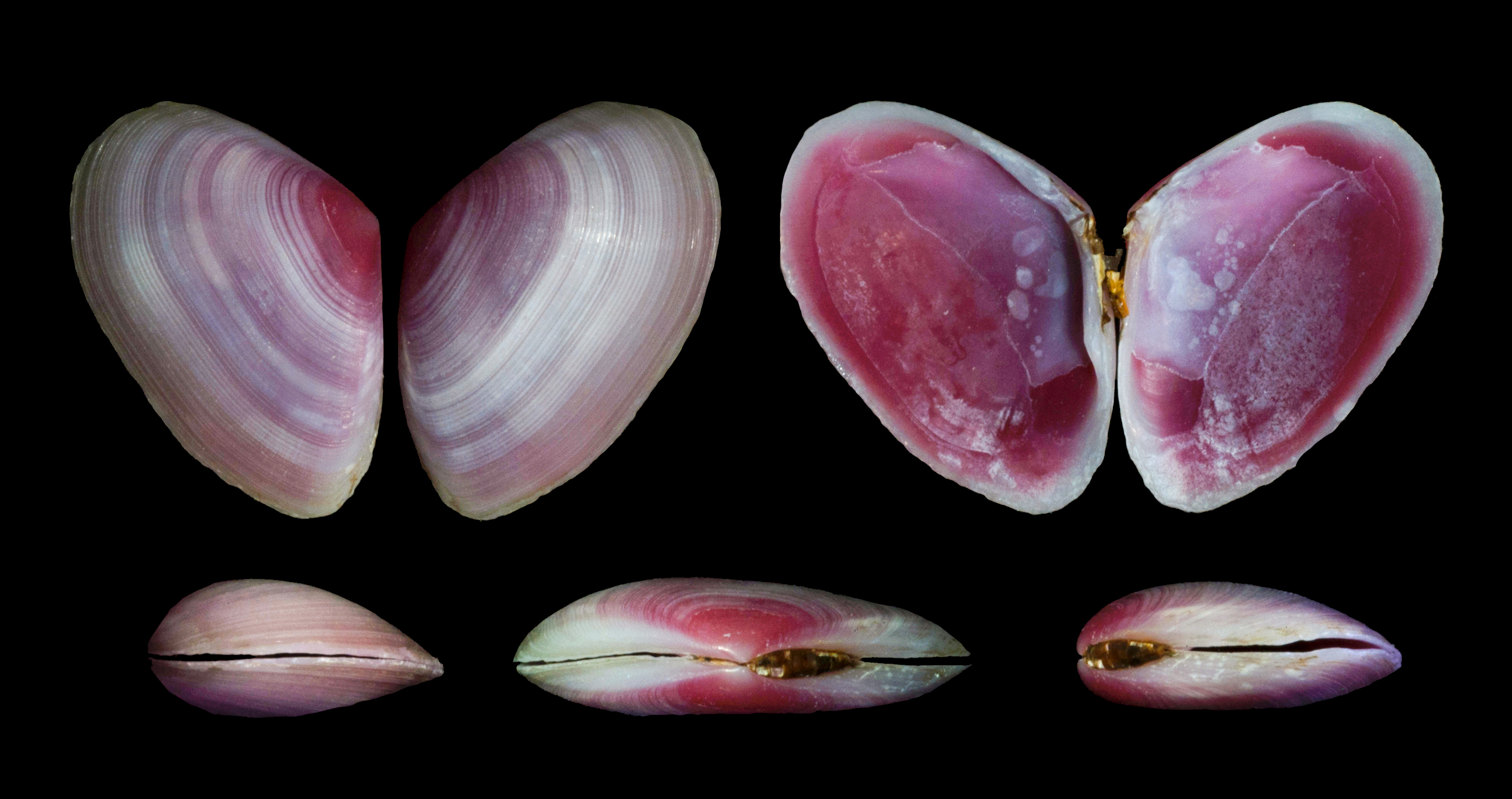
- Eurytellina lineata

Scientific classification
- Kingdom: Animalia
- Phylum: Mollusca
- Class: Bivalvia
- Order: Cardiida
- Family: Tellinidae
- Genus: Eurytellina; P. Fischer, 1887

Type species
- Tellina punicea Born, 1778

Synonyms
- Tellina (Eurytellina) P. Fischer, 1887

= Eurytellina =

Eurytellina Temporal range: Paleocene–Recent

Genus of molluscs

Eurytellina is a genus of marine bivalve molluscs of the family Tellinidae. Members of the genus are primarily found in Pacific and Caribbean waters of central America.

== Description ==
Members of Eurytellina have an elongated shell, a more developed left tooth, proximal anterior and cardinal teeth found on the hinge, a developed pallial sinus, and the absence of a posterior flexure.

== Taxonomy ==
The genus was first described in 1877 by Paul Henri Fischer.

== Distribution ==
Eurytellina is most commonly found in the waters of central America. The earliest known fossils of the genus date to the Paleocene, and have been found in California in the United States.

== Species ==
Species within the genus Eurytellina include:

- Eurytellina alternata (Say, 1822)
- Eurytellina angulosa (Gmelin, 1791)
- Eurytellina eburnea (Hanley, 1844)
- Eurytellina gibber (Ihering, 1907)
- Eurytellina hertleini Olsson, 1961
- Eurytellina hiberna (Hanley, 1844)
- Eurytellina inaequistriata (Donovan, 1802)
- Eurytellina laceridens (Hanley, 1844)
- Eurytellina lineata (W. Turton, 1819)
- Eurytellina nitens (C. B. Adams, 1845)
- Eurytellina prora (Hanley, 1844)
- Eurytellina punicea (Born, 1778)
- Eurytellina regia (Hanley, 1844)
- Eurytellina rubescens (Hanley, 1844)
- Eurytellina simulans (C. B. Adams, 1852)
- †Eurytellina solitaria A. W. B. Powell, 1931
- Eurytellina tayloriana (G. B. Sowerby II, 1867)
- Eurytellina trinitatis Tomlin, 1929
- Eurytellina vespuciana (A. d'Orbigny, 1853)

== Gallery ==
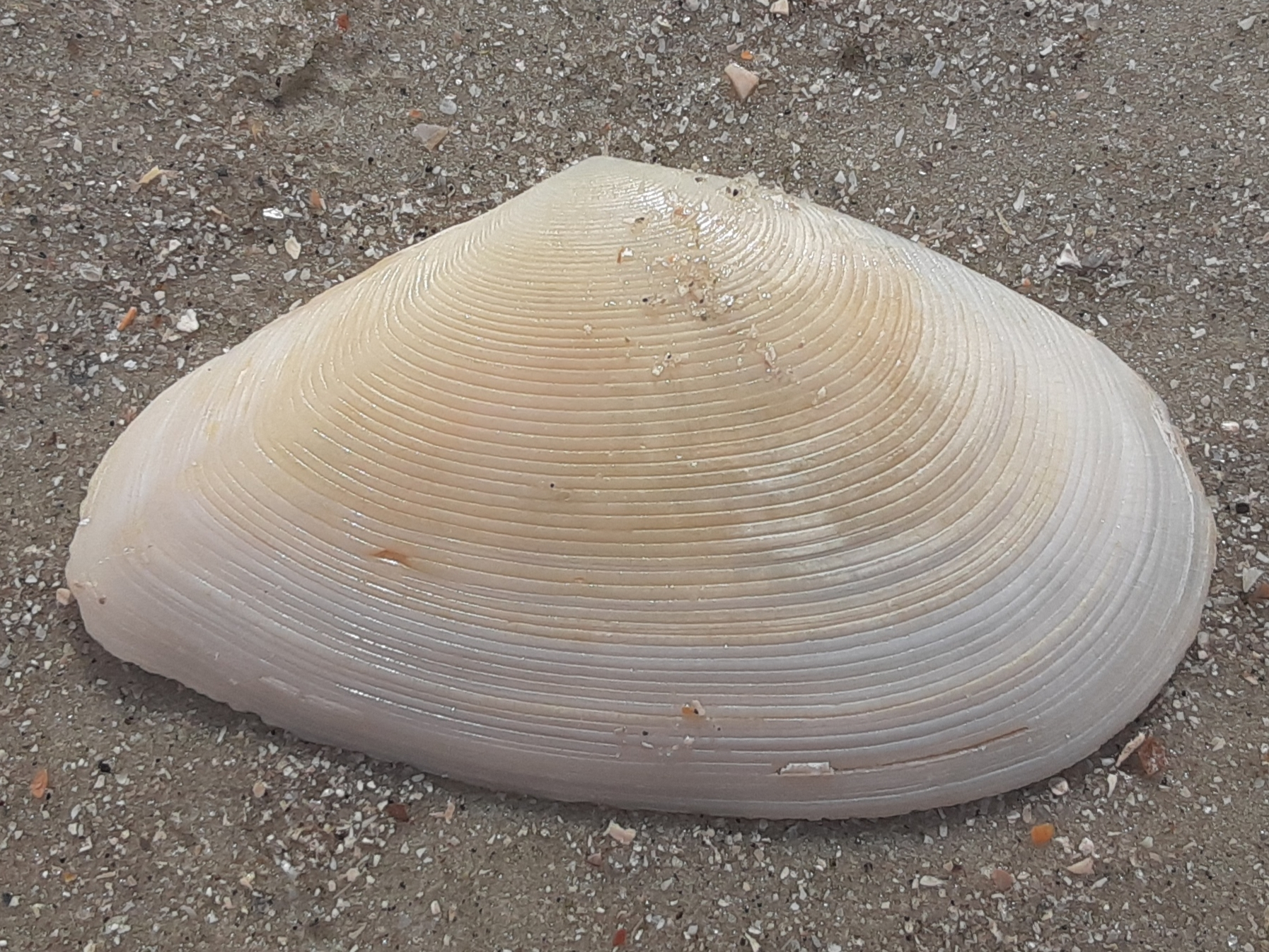
Eurytellina alternata

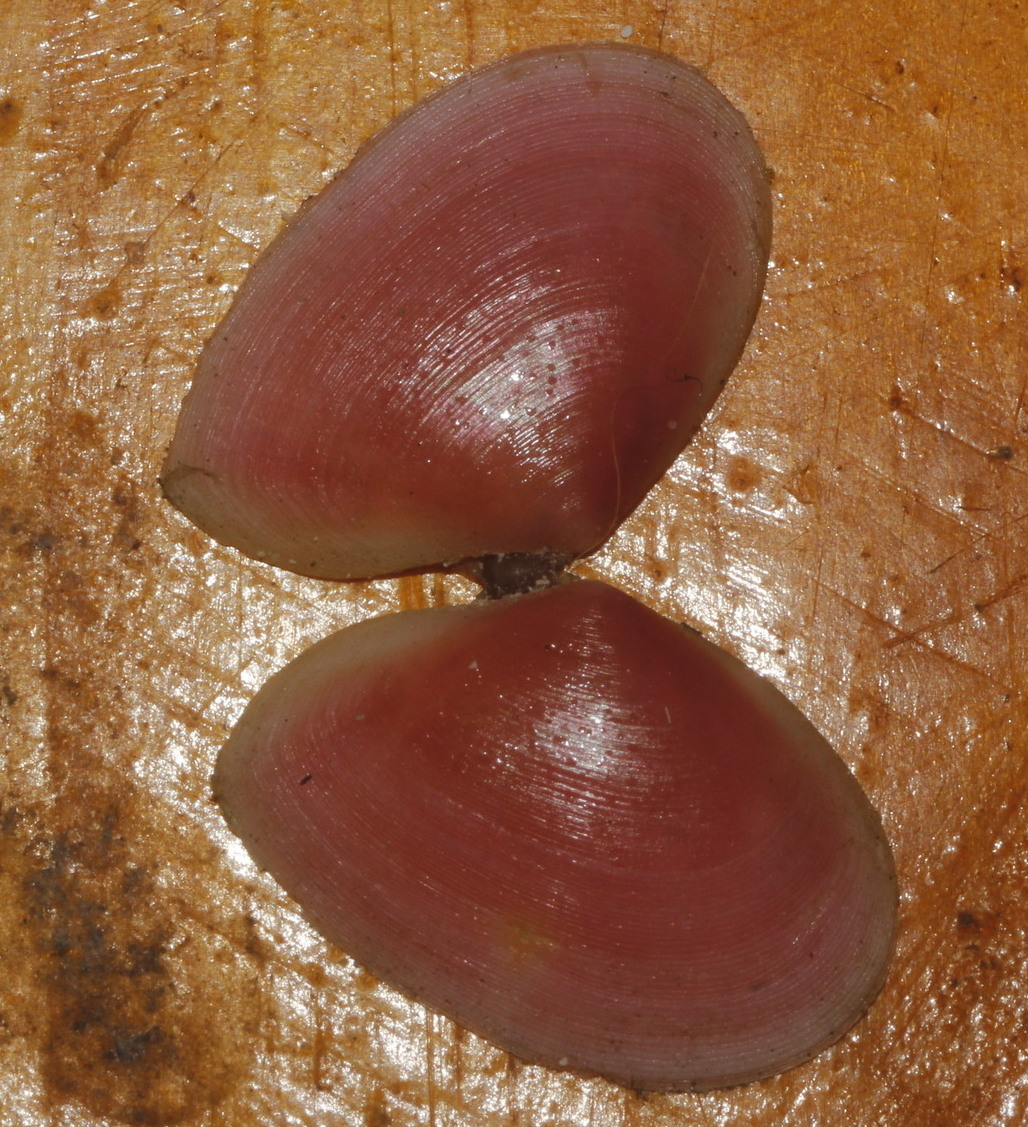
Eurytellina angulosa

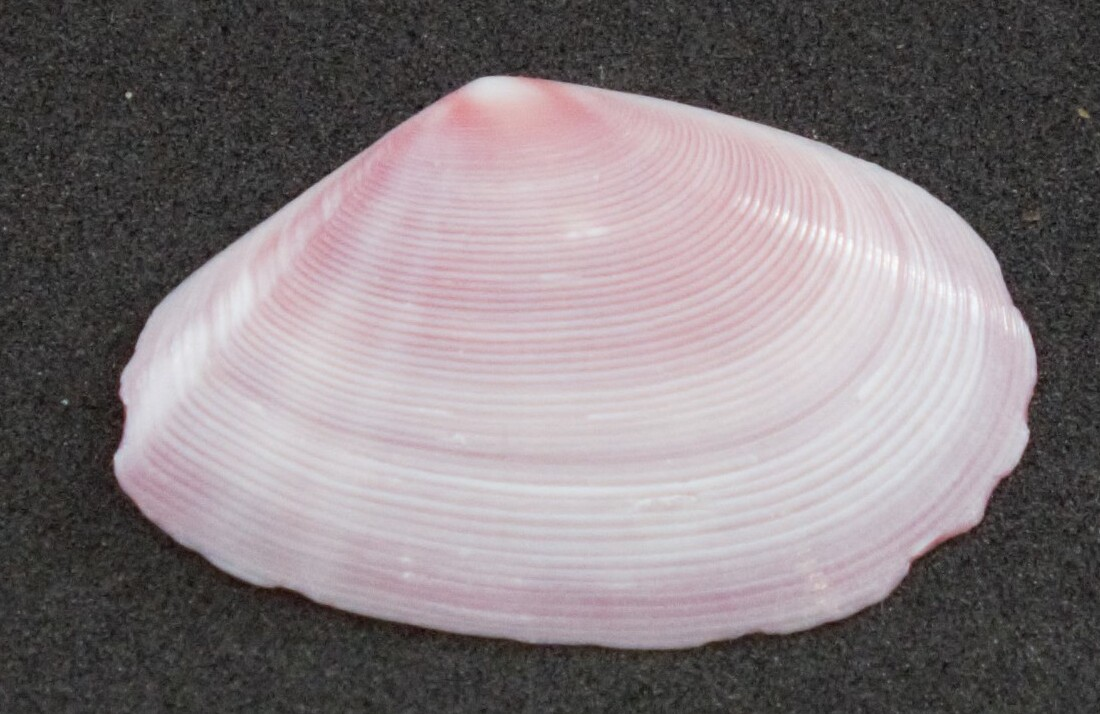
Eurytellina inaequistriata

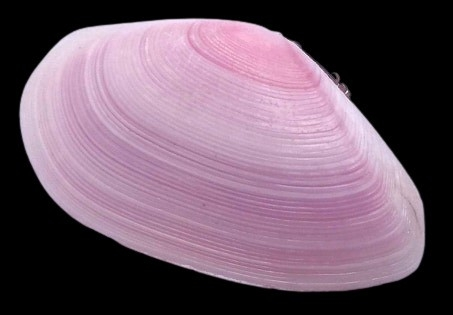
Eurytellina punicea

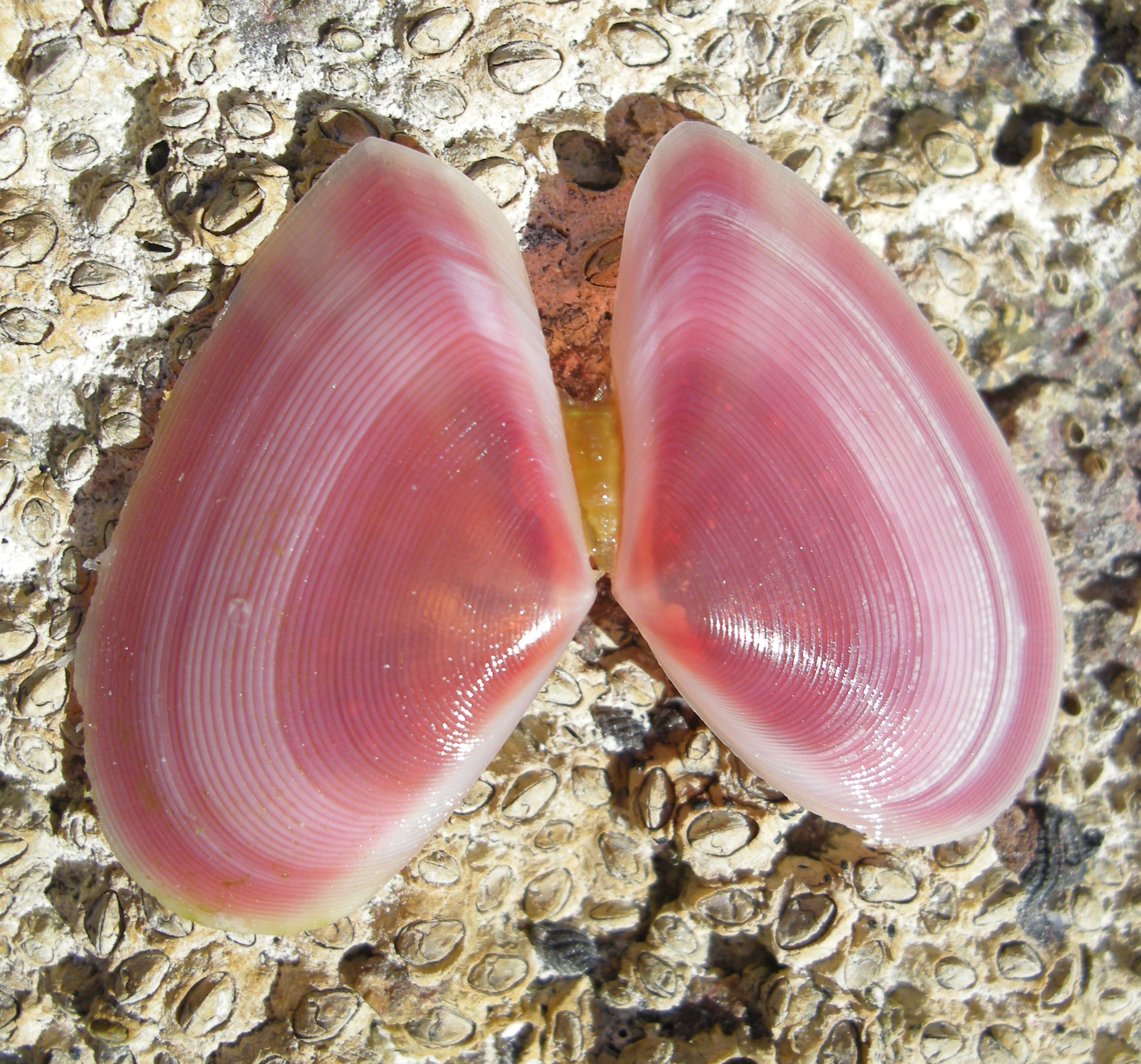
Eurytellina simulans

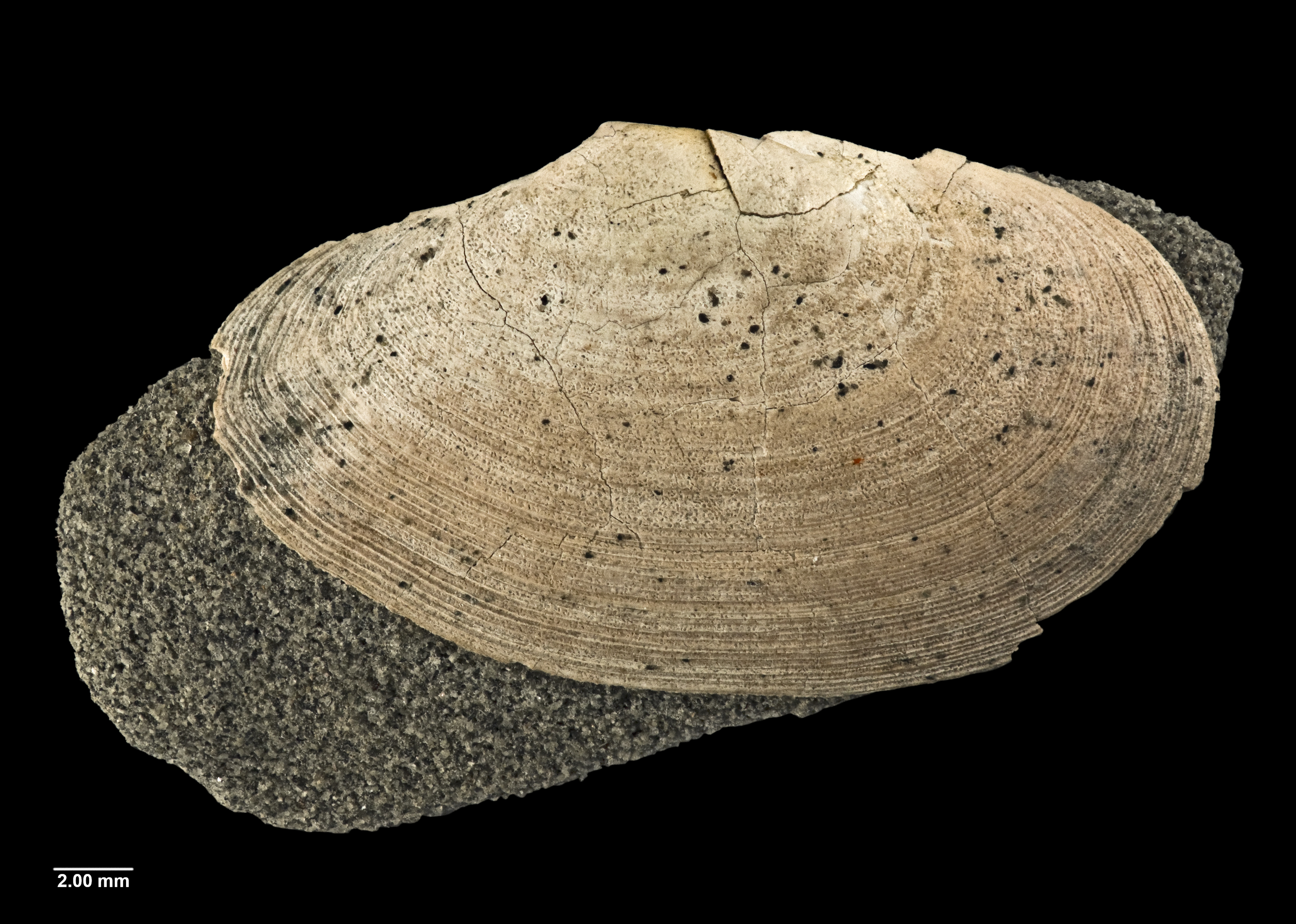
Eurytellina solitaria
