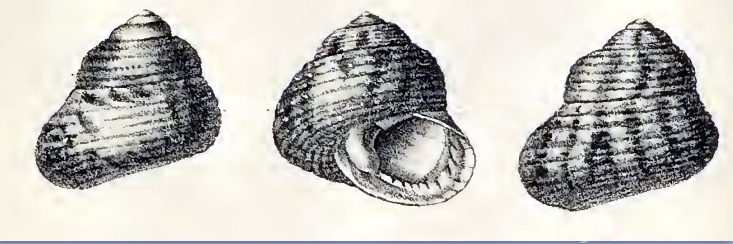
- Drawing with three views of a shell of Agathistoma viridulum

Scientific classification
- Kingdom: Animalia
- Phylum: Mollusca
- Class: Gastropoda
- Subclass: Vetigastropoda
- Order: Trochida
- Family: Tegulidae
- Genus: Agathistoma
- Species: A. viridulum

Binomial name
- Agathistoma viridulum (Gmelin, 1791)

Synonyms
- Chlorostoma viridulum (Gmelin, 1791); Omphalius viridula Gmelin, 1791; Tegula viridula (Gmelin, 1791); Trochus articulatus d'Orbigny, 1841; not Lamarck, 1822; Trochus brasilianus Menke, 1828; Trochus bryonianus W. Wood, 1828; Trochus cruciatus Chemnitz; not Linnaeus, 1758; Trochus viridulus Gmelin, 1791 (basionym)

= Agathistoma viridulum =

Species of gastropod

Agathistoma viridulum is a species of sea snail, a marine gastropod mollusk in the family Tegulidae.

== Description ==
The size of the shell varies between 13 mm and 30 mm. The solid, umbilicate shell has a conoidal shape. Its color is whitish-grayish or greenish, radiately striped above with crimson or rich brown, beneath spotted or radiately striped with the same color. The short spire is rather obtuse. The six whorls are convex, encircled by spiral lirae which are more or less beaded upon the upper surface, the interstices between them minutely spirally striated. On the penultimate whorl they number about six. Below the periphery the lirae are finer, closer, and nearly smooth. The body whorl is obtusely angulate or rounded at the periphery. The base of the shell is rather flattened, somewhat concave around the umbilicus, and generally eroded in front of the aperture. The aperture is oblique. The outer lip beveled to an acute edge, which is usually margined with green and is sulcated or crenulated, the furrows corresponding to the lirae of the outer surface. The pearly throat is also more or less sulcate. The arcuate columella is expanded above in a bright green callus which partly surrounds the umbilicus, at its base green, bearing a tubercular tooth, followed by several smaller ones. The basal margin is smooth or denticulate within. The umbilicus is wide and deep, white or greenish within.

== Distribution ==
This species occurs in the Caribbean Sea off Colombia, Costa Rica, Panama and Venezuela; in the Atlantic of Brazil.
