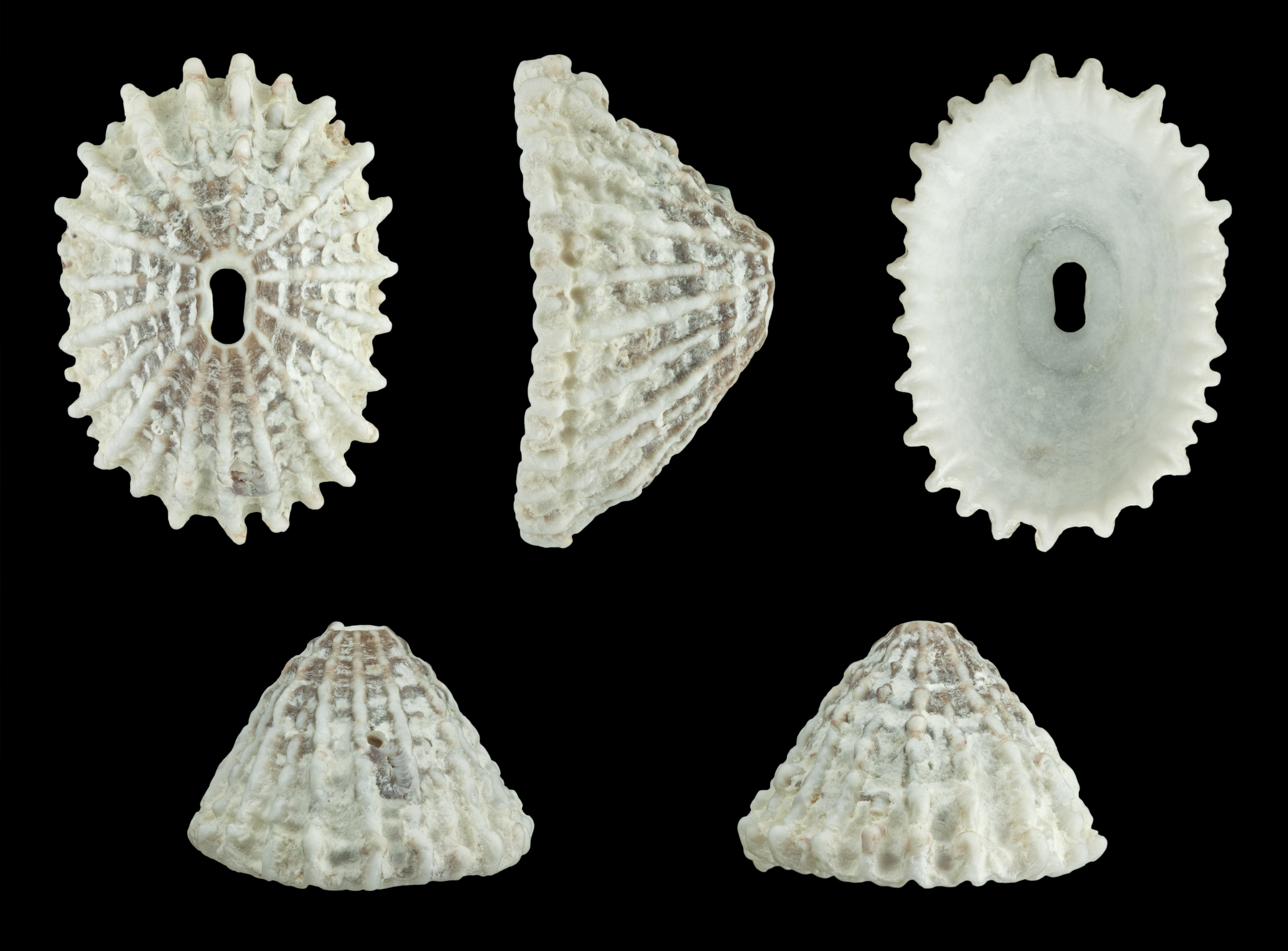
- Fissurella nodosa

Scientific classification
- Kingdom: Animalia
- Phylum: Mollusca
- Class: Gastropoda
- Subclass: Vetigastropoda
- Order: Lepetellida
- Family: Fissurellidae
- Genus: Fissurella
- Species: F. nodosa

Binomial name
- Fissurella nodosa (Born, 1778)

Synonyms
- Patella rudis Röding, 1798

= Fissurella nodosa =

Species of gastropod

Fissurella nodosa, commonly known as the knobbed keyhole limpet, is a species of sea snail, a marine gastropod mollusk in the family Fissurellidae, the keyhole limpets.

== Description ==
The size of an adult shell varies between 20 mm and 44 mm.

== Distribution ==
F. nodosa is endemic to the Florida Keys, the Gulf of Mexico, the Caribbean Sea and the West Indies.
