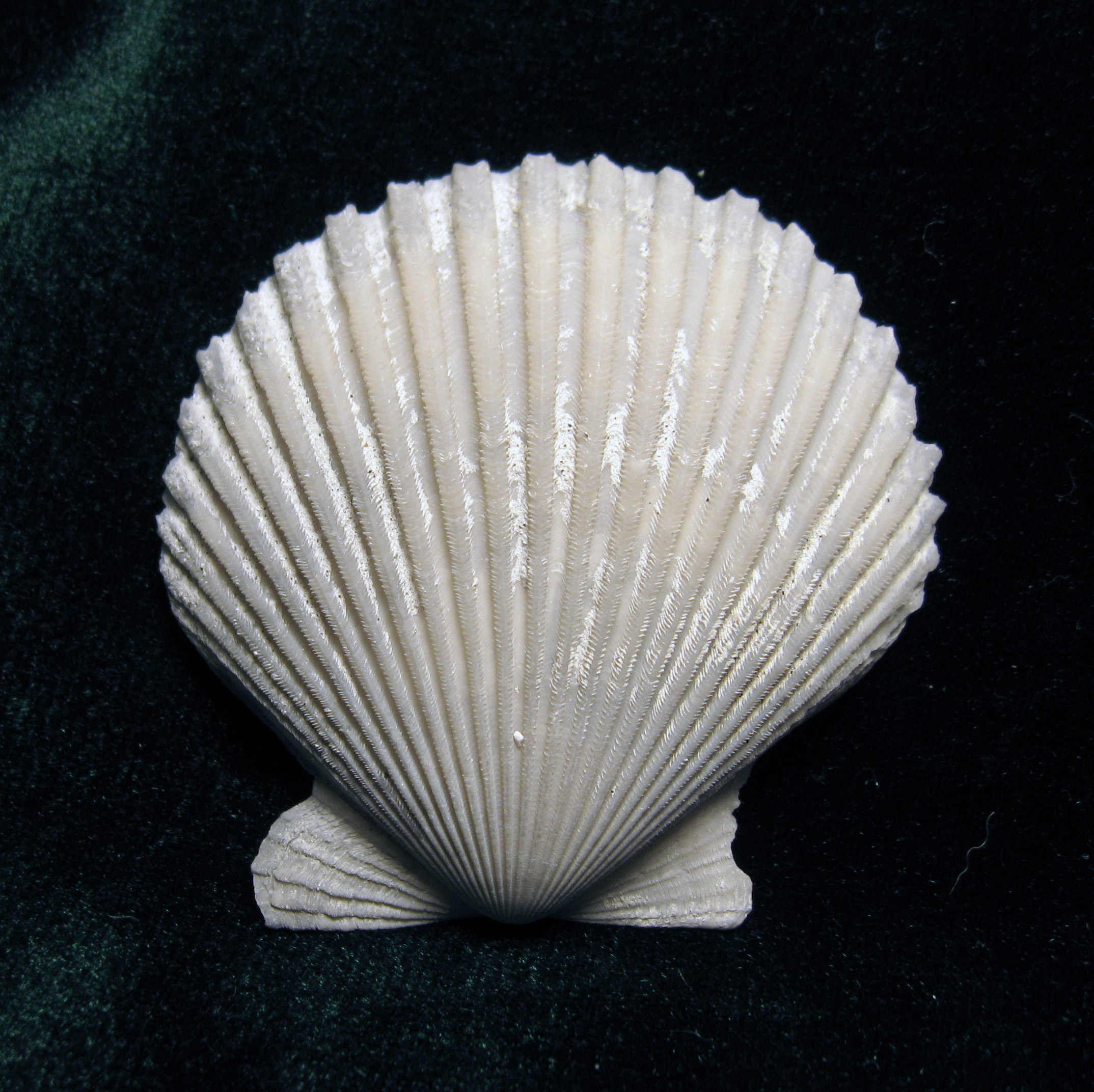

Scientific classification
- Domain: Eukaryota
- Kingdom: Animalia
- Phylum: Mollusca
- Class: Bivalvia
- Order: Pectinida
- Family: Pectinidae
- Genus: Argopecten
- Species: A. ventricosus

Binomial name
- Argopecten ventricosus (Sowerby II, 1842)

= Argopecten ventricosus =

Species of bivalve

Argopecten ventricosus is a species of bivalve belonging to the family Pectinidae.

The species is found in America.
