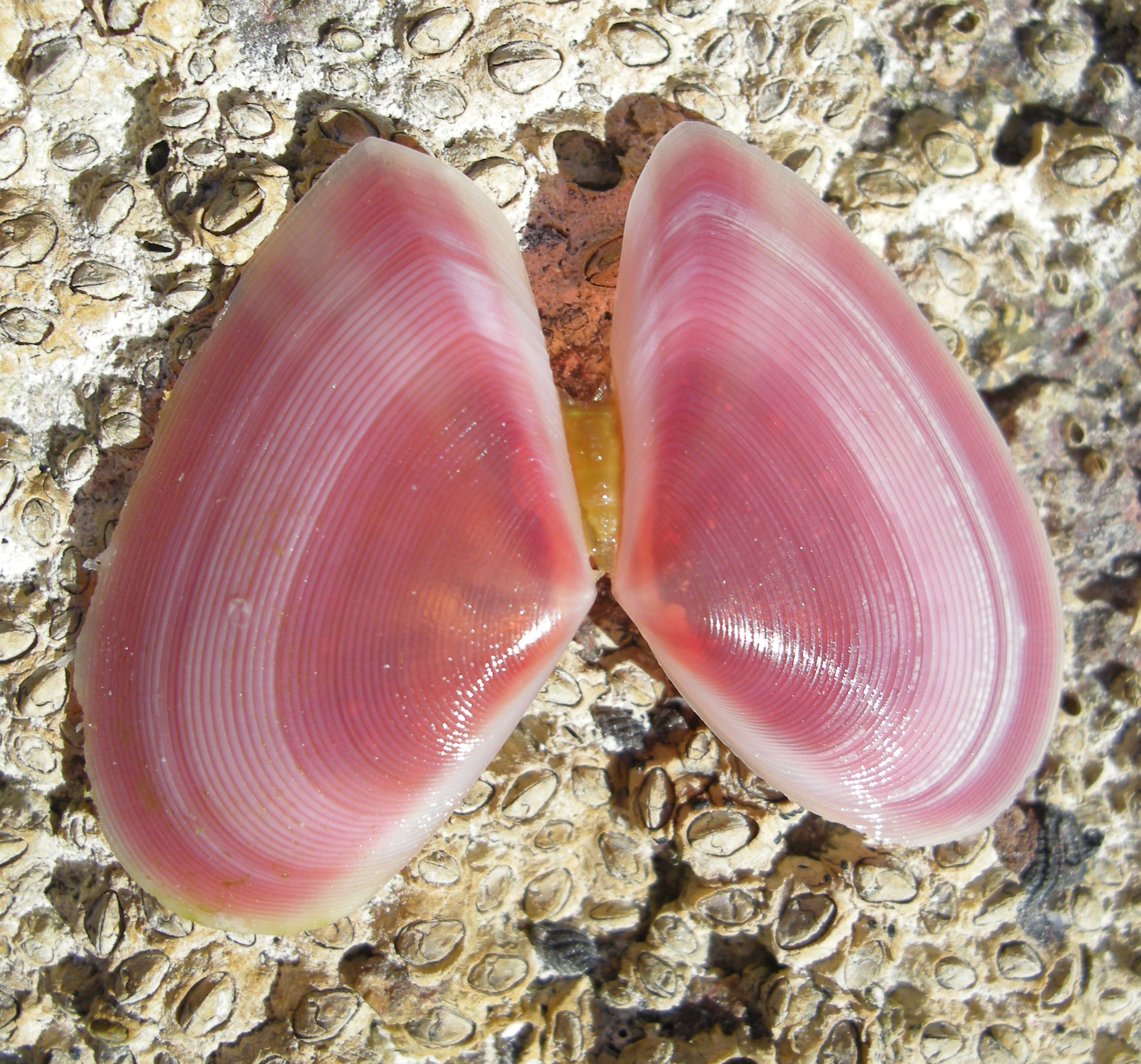
- Exterior of valves
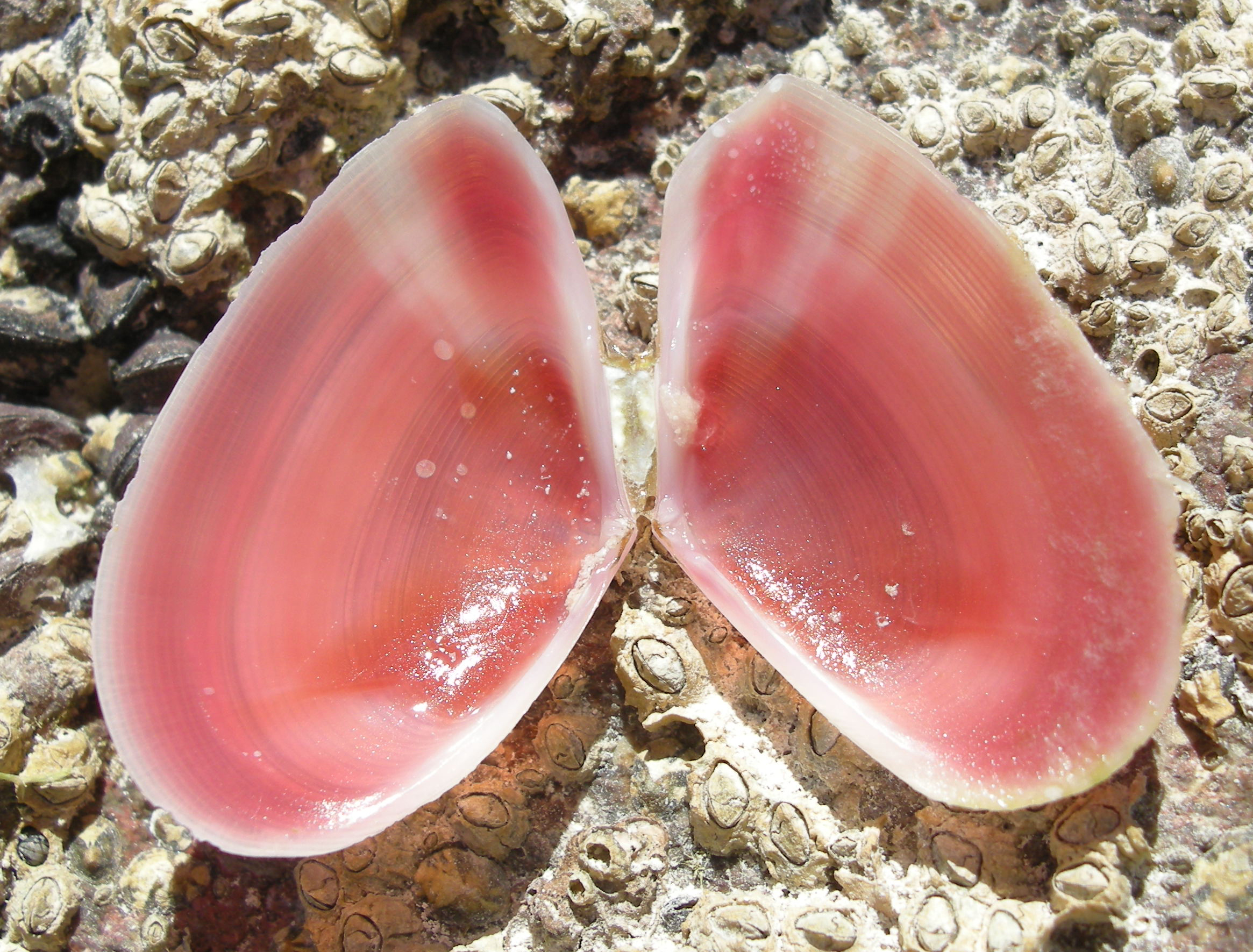
- Interior of valves

Scientific classification
- Kingdom: Animalia
- Phylum: Mollusca
- Class: Bivalvia
- Order: Cardiida
- Family: Tellinidae
- Genus: Eurytellina
- Species: E. simulans

Binomial name
- Eurytellina simulans (Charles Baker Adams, 1852)

Synonyms
- Tellina simulans C.B. Adams, 1852

= Eurytellina simulans =

Species of bivalve

Eurytellina simulans is a species of bivalve mollusc. This species was previously known as Tellina simulans.

== Description ==
The rose-red shells can reach 45 mm (1.8") long and 11mm (.4") in depth. The valves are connected by a short, prominent ligament. Lateral teeth are small or nonexistent. The valves are concentrically sculpted and more sharply triangular in cross-section than a similar Tellin, Eurytellina rubescens. Another difference between these two closely related species is that the pallial sinus does not touch the anterior adductor scar in E. simulans, while it does in E. rubescens.

The animal was originally described to science by naturalist Charles Baker Adams, a professor of zoology at Amherst College. Adams left for an expedition to Panama in mid-November 1850. He collected furiously upon arrival, and on January 3, 1851, shipped eight crates back to Massachusetts. These contained 41,830 specimens of 516 species of molluscs. He described Tellina simulans on the basis of a single valve.

== Distribution ==
These tellins live in the Eastern Pacific from Scammon's Lagoon, Baja California Sur, Mexico to Peru, including the Gulf of California.

== Habitat ==
Buried in sand and mud, from the intertidal zone to 24 meters (78') deep. Like other Tellins, they are filter feeders, extending their siphons up through the sand in order to breathe, strain nutrients from the water, spawn, and to excrete waste products.
