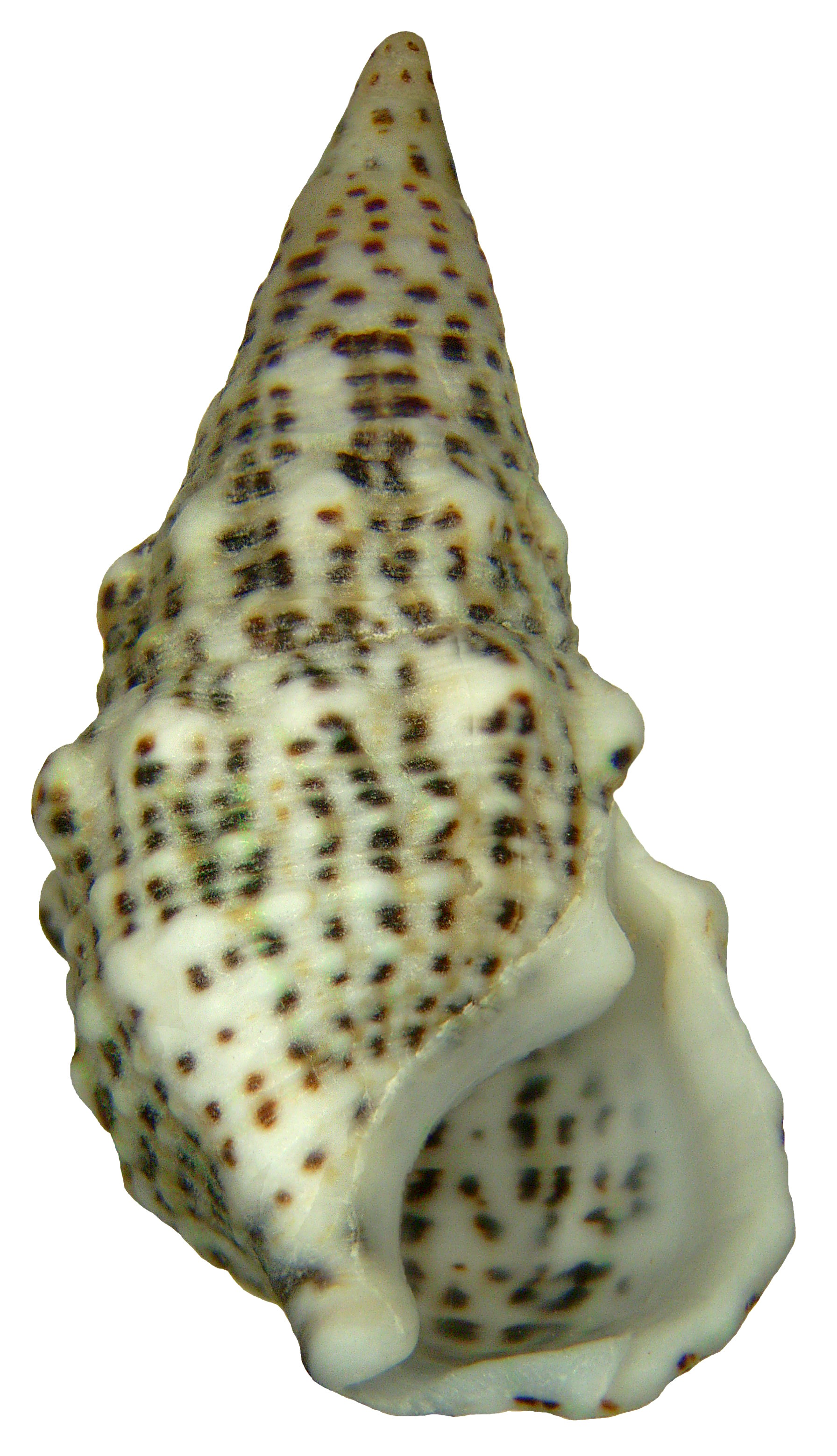
- Cerithium litteratum shell

Scientific classification
- Kingdom: Animalia
- Phylum: Mollusca
- Class: Gastropoda
- Subclass: Caenogastropoda
- Order: incertae sedis
- Family: Cerithiidae
- Genus: Cerithium
- Species: C. litteratum

Binomial name
- Cerithium litteratum (Born, 1778)

Synonyms
- Cerithium angustum Anton, 1838; Cerithium litteratum playagrandensis Weisbord, 1962; Cerithium semiferrugineum Lamarck, 1822; Murex literatus Murex litteratus Born, 1778

= Cerithium litteratum =

Species of gastropod

Cerithium litteratum is a species of sea snail, a marine gastropod mollusk in the family Cerithiidae.

== Distribution ==
Cerithium litteratum has been living in shallower waters and reefs of the Western Central Atlantic Ocean, from South Carolina to Florida including the Gulf of Mexico in North America over Central America (Belize) to South America (Brazil), and has been documented in the Indian Ocean. It prefers water temperatures and ecosystems associated with a tropical climate. It was judged to be an 'occasional' alien species in the Mediterranean Sea, based on a 1978 find by fishers in the Aegean Sea.

== Description ==
As of 2010 the maximum recorded shell length has been 34 mm.

== Habitat and ecology ==
As of 2010 the snail has been found between sea level and a maximum recorded depth of 88 m below sea level. which means it lives in the sunlight zone of the pelagic.

The snail is a herbivore, feeding on algae for example. Small hermit crabs, mostly Calcinus tibicen but also Paguristes punticeps and Paguristes cadenati have long been known to move into its empty shells.

Experimental evidence exists, that the snail helps to recruit corals by removing algae on subsurfaces, which compete with the coral's settlement.

Fish prey on the snail, and the Caribbean hogfish, Lachnolaimus maximus for example, can crush the mollusc with its jaw. Biomechanical research has found Cerithium predation to be limited by force, rather than by the gape of the jaw.
