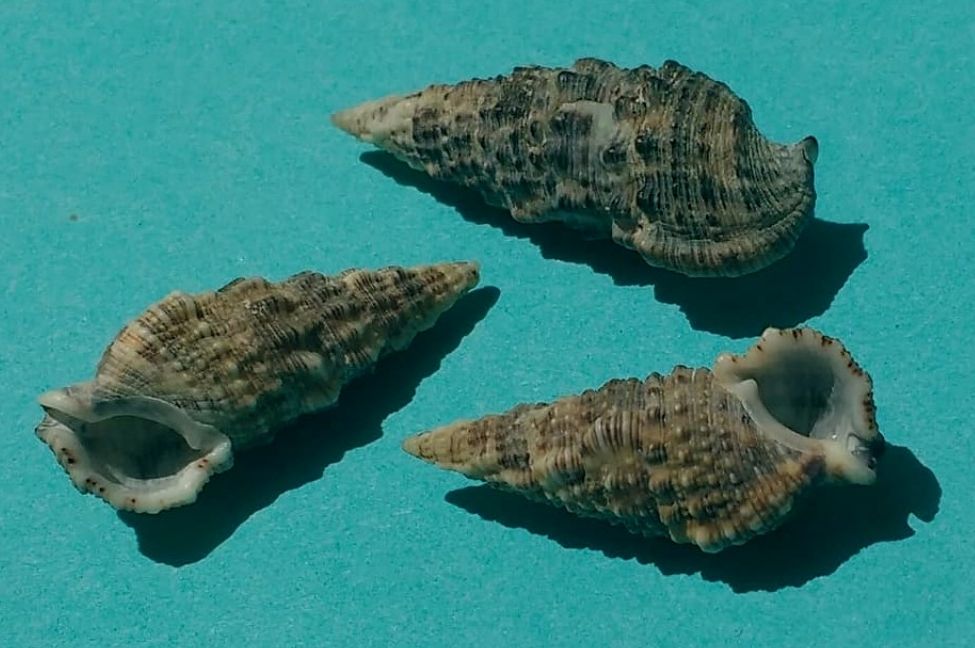
- Cerithium atratum shells

Scientific classification
- Kingdom: Animalia
- Phylum: Mollusca
- Class: Gastropoda
- Subclass: Caenogastropoda
- Order: incertae sedis
- Family: Cerithiidae
- Genus: Cerithium
- Species: C. atratum

Binomial name
- Cerithium atratum (Born, 1778)

Synonyms
- List: Cerithium (Thericium) preatratum Olsson & Harbison, 1953; Cerithium (Thericium) vicinia Olsson & Harbison, 1953; Cerithium antillarum Mörch, 1876; Cerithium atratum var. tenuis Mörch, 1876; Cerithium caudatum G.B. Sowerby II, 1855; Cerithium floridanum Mörch, 1876; Cerithium floridanum leonensis Mansfield, 1930; Cerithium floridanum var. cruzana Usticke, 1959; Cerithium graciliforme G.B. Sowerby II, 1865; Cerithium peratratum; Cerithium striatissimum G.B. Sowerby II, 1855; Cerithium subatratum Kobelt, 1898; Cerithium umbonatum G.B. Sowerby II, 1855; Murex atratus Born, 1778

= Cerithium atratum =

Species of gastropod

Cerithium atratum is a species of sea snail, a marine gastropod mollusk in the family Cerithiidae.

== Distribution ==
The distribution of Cerithium atratum includes the Western Atlantic.

- Brazil
- Belize

== Description ==
The maximum recorded shell length is 50 mm.

== Habitat ==
The minimum recorded depth for this species is 0 m; the maximum recorded depth is 91 m.
