= Agathistoma nordestinum =

Scientific classification
- Kingdom: Animalia
- Phylum: Mollusca
- Class: Gastropoda
- Subclass: Vetigastropoda
- Order: Trochida
- Family: Tegulidae
- Genus: Agathistoma
- Species: A. nordestinum

Binomial name
- Agathistoma nordestinum Dornellas, Gabroski, Hellberg & Lotufo, 2021

Species of gastropod

Agathistoma nordestinum is a species of sea snail, a marine gastropod mollusk in the family Tegulidae. It is endemic to Brazil, and is known to occur in the northeastern region of the country.

== Distribution ==
Agathistoma nordestinum occurs in northeastern Brazil, from the state of Maranhão to Bahia, and is usually found between rocks at 1–2 meters during the low tide.

== Description and etymology ==
The shell of this species has five whorls and attains 13 mm in height, with a maximum width of 10 mm. It is globose, with a rounded profile between the spire and base and has a marked keel forming a slight shoulder. It is coloured yellow cream at the base, with axially aligned irregular dark brownish or light brown blotches. The specific epithet nordestinum is a reference to Northeast Brazil. In Portuguese, people born in this region are called nordestinos.
