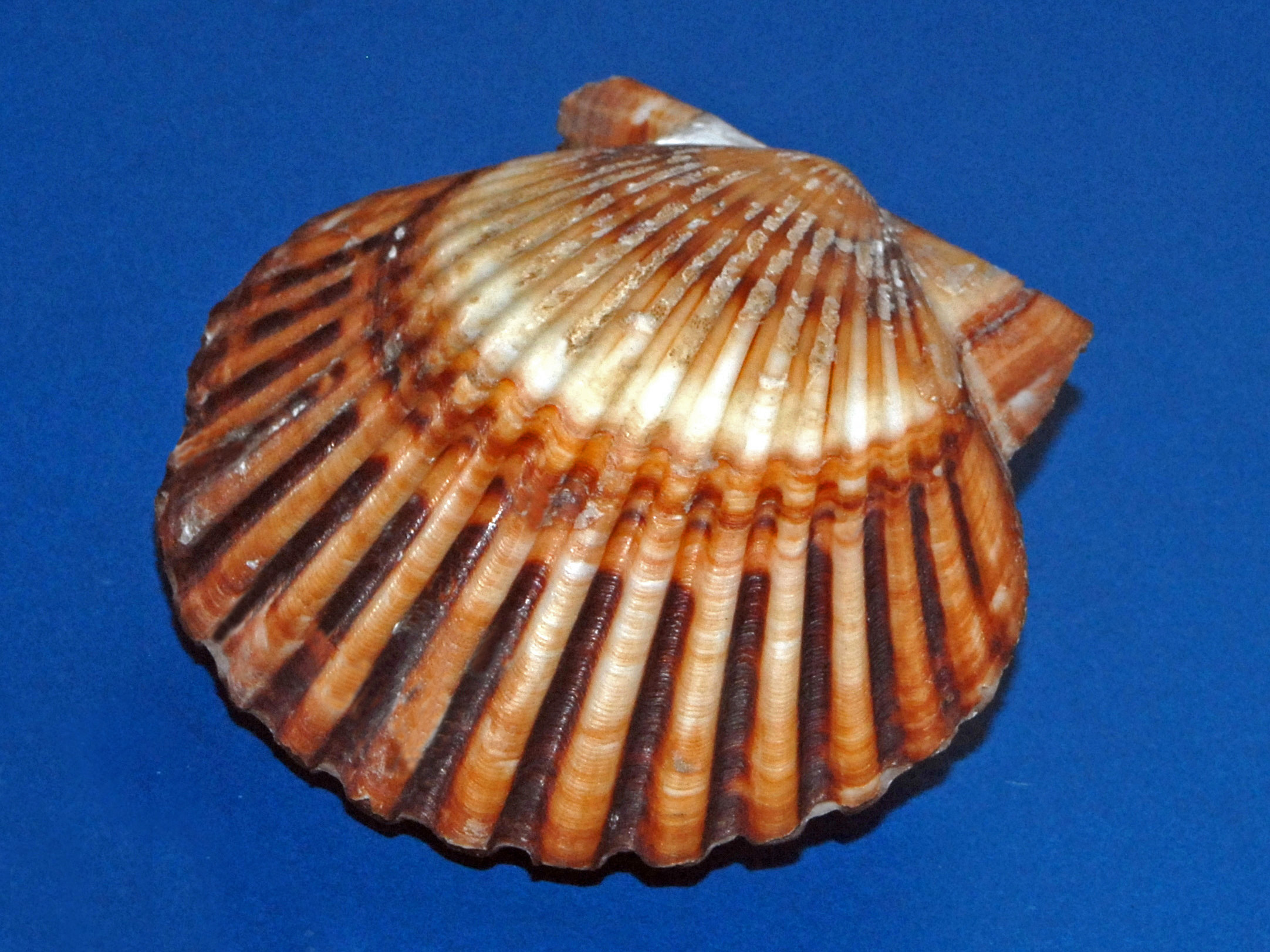
- Shell of Argopecten irradians from Bermuda Islands at the Museo Civico di Storia Naturale di Milano

Scientific classification
- Domain: Eukaryota
- Kingdom: Animalia
- Phylum: Mollusca
- Class: Bivalvia
- Order: Pectinida
- Family: Pectinidae
- Genus: Argopecten; Monterosato, 1889

Species
- See text

= Argopecten =

Genus of bivalves

Argopecten is a genus of saltwater clams, or scallops, marine bivalve mollusks in the family Pectinidae.

== Species ==
Species within the genus Argopecten include:

- Argopecten gibbus (Linnaeus, 1767) — Atlantic calico scallop
- Argopecten irradians (Lamarck, 1819) — Atlantic bay scallop (five subspecies)
- Argopecten lineolaris (Lamarck, 1819)
- Argopecten nucleus (Born, 1778) — nucleus scallop
- Argopecten purpuratus (Lamarck, 1819) — Peruvian calico scallop or Chilean-Peruvian scallop
- Argopecten ventricosus (Sowerby II, 1842)

== Extinct species ==
- Argopecten ameleus Woodring 1925
- Argopecten antonitaensis Durham 1950
- Argopecten callidus Hertlein 1925
- Argopecten crassiradiatus Clark 1915
- Argopecten cristobalensis Hertlein 1925
- Argopecten demiurgus Dall 1898
- Argopecten deserti Conrad 1855
- Argopecten diminutivus Hertlein 1927
- Argopecten eboreus yorkensis Conrad 1867
- Argopecten eccentricus Gabb 1873
- Argopecten ericellus Hertlein 1929
- Argopecten evermanni Jordan and Hertlein 1926
- Argopecten gilbertharrisi Hodson and Hodson 1927
- Argopecten gratus del Rio 1992
- Argopecten hakei Hertlein 1925
- Argopecten inaequalis Sowerby 1850
- Argopecten insuetus del Rio 1992
- Argopecten invalidus Hanna 1924
- Argopecten levicostatus Toula 1909
- Argopecten mendenhalli Arnold 1906
- Argopecten nerterus Woodring 1982
- Argopecten parathetidis Waller 2011
- Argopecten percarus Hertlein 1925
- Argopecten revellei Durham 1950
- Argopecten subdolus Hertlein 1925
- Argopecten sverdrupi Durham 1950
- Argopecten thetidis Sowerby 1850
- Argopecten uselmae Pilsbry and Johnson 1917
- Argopecten venezuelanus Hodson and Hodson 1927
- Argopecten woodringi Spieker 1922
