= Agathistoma =

Scientific classification
- Kingdom: Animalia
- Phylum: Mollusca
- Class: Gastropoda
- Subclass: Vetigastropoda
- Order: Trochida
- Superfamily: Trochoidea
- Family: Tegulidae
- Genus: Agathistoma; Olsson & Harbison, 1953

Type species
- Trochus viridulus Gmelin, 1791

Synonyms
- Tegula (Agathistoma) Olsson & Harbison, 1953 · alternate representation

Genus of sea snails

Agathistoma is a genus of small to medium-sized sea snails, marine gastropod molluscs in the family Tegulidae.

== Species ==
- Agathistoma fasciatum (Born, 1778)
- Agathistoma hotessierianum (d'Orbigny, 1842)
- Agathistoma lividomaculatum (C. B. Adams, 1845)
- Agathistoma nordestinum Dornellas, Graboski, Hellberg & Lotufo, 2021
- Agathistoma viridulum (Gmelin, 1791)
