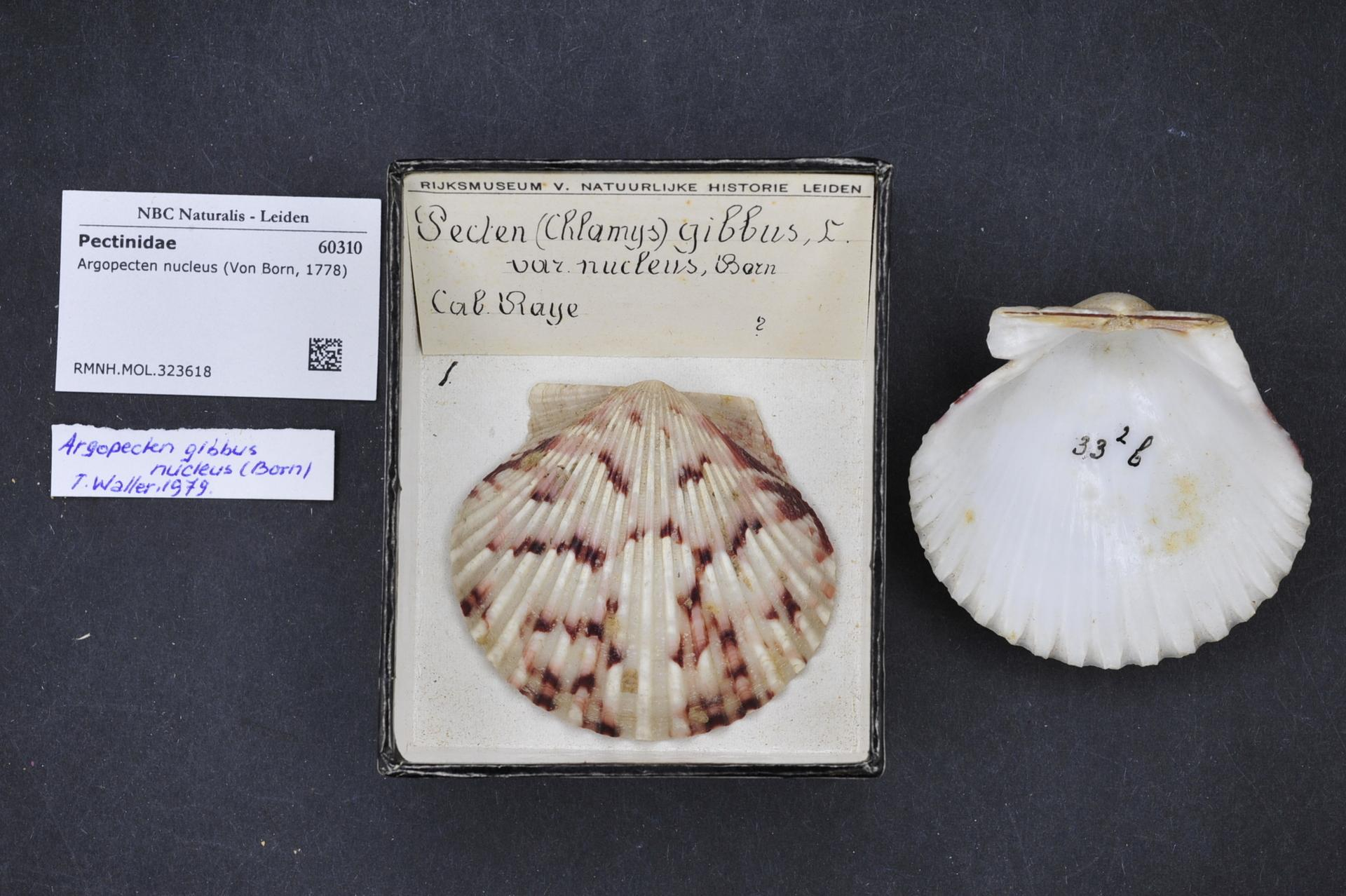

Scientific classification
- Kingdom: Animalia
- Phylum: Mollusca
- Class: Bivalvia
- Order: Pectinida
- Family: Pectinidae
- Genus: Argopecten
- Species: A. nucleus

Binomial name
- Argopecten nucleus (Sowerby, 1825)

= Argopecten nucleus =

Species of bivalve

Argopecten nucleus, or the nucleus scallop, is a species of bivalve mollusc in the family Pectinidae. It can be found in Caribbean waters, ranging from southern Florida to the West Indies.
