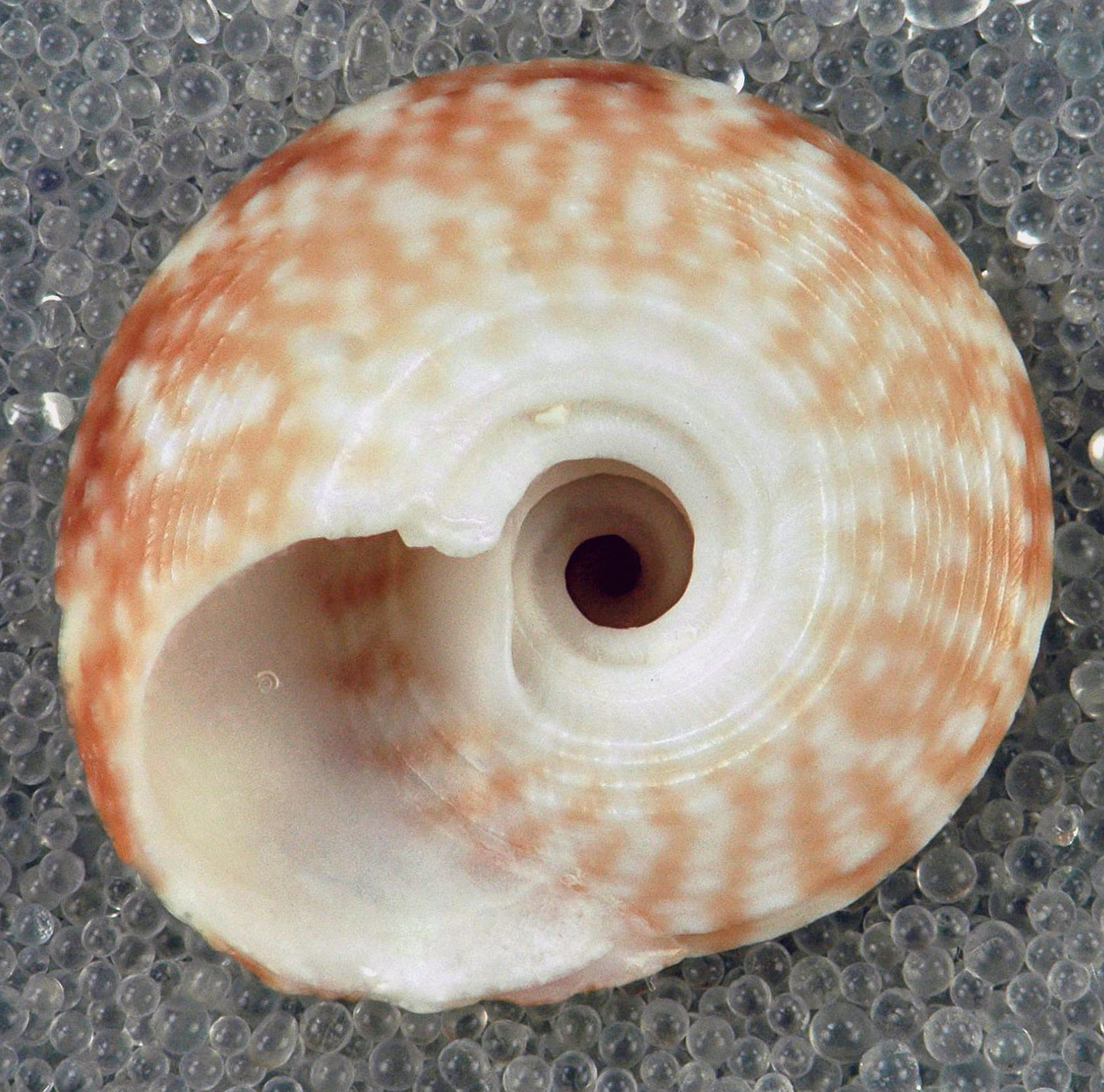
- Agathistoma lividomaculatum (shell)

Scientific classification
- Kingdom: Animalia
- Phylum: Mollusca
- Class: Gastropoda
- Subclass: Vetigastropoda
- Order: Trochida
- Family: Tegulidae
- Genus: Agathistoma
- Species: A. lividomaculatum

Binomial name
- Agathistoma lividomaculatum (C. B. Adams, 1845)

Synonyms
- Astele turbinata Tenison Woods, 1877 · unaccepted (junior synonym); Chlorostoma scalaris Philippi, 1844; Monilea turbinata Tenison Woods, 1877; Monodonta lividomaculata C. B. Adams, 1845; Tegula scalaris (C.B. Adams, 1845); Tegula semigranosa auct. non A. Adams, 1853; Trochus gundlachii Philippi, 1849; Trochus indusii auct. non Gmelin, 1791; Trochus scalaris Philippi, 1844

= Agathistoma lividomaculatum =

Species of gastropod

Agathistoma lividomaculatum, common name the West Indian tegula, is a species of sea snail, a marine gastropod mollusk in the family Tegulidae.

== Description ==
The size of the shell varies between 10 mm and 22 mm. The imperforate shell has a broadly ovate-conical shape. The color of the shell is a pale gray to brownish-white with small mottlings of dark brown or reddish brown. This mottling often occurs in axial streaks. The top of the rounded whorls show numerous, small spiral cords, with the largest cord on the angular periphery. The sutures are narrow. The base of the shell is slightly rounded. The aperture is almost round and has a curved lip. The inside of the lip is sulcate. The spiral platform descends into the deep and round umbilicus. It shows on its sides furrows of two spiral cords. The columella is set back far at its upper half and has several beads at its base.

== Distribution ==
This species occurs abundantly under rocks at low tide in the Caribbean Sea, the Gulf of Mexico but rather uncommon in the Florida Keys; and off the Lesser Antilles at depths between 0 m and 2 m.
