= Ignaz von Born =

Austrian mineralogist and metallurgist

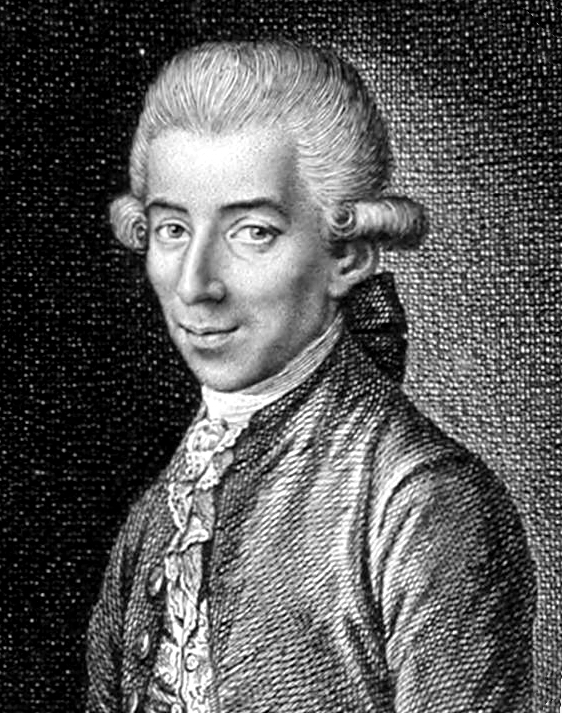
A portrait of Ignaz von Born

Ignaz Edler von Born, also known as Ignatius von Born (Hungarian: Born Ignác, Romanian: Ignațiu von Born, Czech: Ignác Born) (26 December 1742 in Alba Iulia, Grand Principality of Transylvania, Habsburg monarchy – 24 July 1791 in Vienna), was a mineralogist and metallurgist. He was a prominent freemason, being head of Vienna's lodge and an influential anti-clerical writer. He was the leading scientist in the Holy Roman Empire during the 1770s in the Age of Enlightenment.

His interests include mining, mineralogy, palaeontology, chemistry, metallurgy and malacology.

== Biography ==
Born belonged to a noble family of Transylvanian Saxon origin. He started school in his hometown, then was educated in a Jesuit college in Vienna, but left the Jesuits after sixteen months to study law at Prague University. He then travelled extensively to present-day Germany, the Netherlands, and France, studying mineralogy, and on his return to Prague in 1770 entered the department of mines and the mint.

In 1776 he was appointed by Maria Theresa to arrange the imperial museum at Vienna (German: K.k. Hof-Naturalienkabinette, the predecessor of today's Naturhistorisches Museum), where he was nominated to the council of mines and the mint, and continued to reside until his death.

He introduced a method of extracting metals by amalgamation (Uber des Anquicken der Erze, 1786), and other improvements in mining and other technical processes. His publications also include Lithophylacium Bornianum (1772–1775) and Bergbaukunde (1789), besides several museum catalogues.

Born attempted satire with no great success. Die Staatsperücke, a tale published without his knowledge in 1772. He criticised state bureaucracy in this work. And an attack on Father Hell, the Jesuit, and king's astronomer at Vienna, are two of his satirical works. Part of a satire, entitled Monachologia, in which the monks are described in the technical language of natural history, is also ascribed to him.

Born was well acquainted with Latin and the principal modern languages of Europe, and with many branches of science not immediately connected with metallurgy and mineralogy. He took an active part in the political changes in Hungary. After the death of the emperor Joseph II, the diet of the states of Hungary rescinded many innovations of that ruler, and conferred the rights of denizen on several persons who had been favourable to the cause of the Hungarians, and, amongst others, on Born.

In 1771 Born was elected a foreign member of the Royal Swedish Academy of Sciences and in 1774 a Fellow of the Royal Society

In 1781 Born proposed that Austria undertake a scientific voyage round the world, emulating those of Cook. The expedition was described in the press in the following terms:

Vienna, 20 July 1782. His Majesty the Emperor has ordered Councillor von Born, one of our Monarchy's most learned savants, to put forward two subjects experienced in Natural History, to send to America in order to make new discoveries there. Mr. Heidinger, Adjunct in the Imperial Natural History Cabinet, and Doctor Maerter, Lecturer in Natural History at the Theresianum, were presented and approved; also, a Gardener and a Painter were included with them. They will go by Cape Horn to Otaheiti, from thence to Sandwich Island, to the American Coast on the North side of California, and finally to China. They both have knowledge of all areas of Natural History; it can therefore be assured that their discoveries will be of much greater ambit and usefulness than all that have been made hitherto, since Banks, Solander, and Forster looked at few other Objects of Natural History than Botany. At the end of August, they will sail on the Ship Comte de Cobenzell.

Born himself hoped to lead the expedition, but the poor state of his health meant that he had to relinquish the post of leader in favour of Franz Josef Maerter, who was accompanied by Franz Boos. Subsequently, in July 1789, Born recommended Thaddaeus Haenke to the Spanish Government for appointment as botanist on the Malaspina expedition.

In 1790, he catalogued the mineral collection of Éléonore de Raab, and this work formed the basis of William Babington's 1799 work A New System of Mineralogy, in the form of a Catalogue, after the manner of Baron Born's Systematic Catalogue of the collection of fossils of Mlle Éléonore de Raab.

At the time of his death in 1791, he was writing Fasti Leopoldini, probably relating to the prudent conduct of Leopold II, the successor of Joseph, towards the Hungarians.

As an active freemason in the "Benevolence" lodge, he introduced and tutored Mozart into the lodge. Born's essay Über die Mysterien der Ägypter (The Mysteries of the Egyptians), published in 1784 in the freemason periodical Journal für Freymaurer, was one of the sources for the libretto for The Magic Flute written for Mozart by Emanuel Schikaneder. Born was also the regional head of the Viennese Illuminati lodge, and was a sympathiser with the Enlightenment ideas of Gotthold Ephraim Lessing. He published an anticlerical satire called Monachologien in 1783, in which he depicts monks as being of a distinct race that is a mixture between ape and man.

The mineral bornite (Cu_{5}FeS_{4}), a common copper ore mineral was named in his honour.

== Selected publications ==
- Born, I. 1778. Index rerum naturalium Musei Cæsarei Vindobonensis. Pars I.ma. Testacea. Verzeichniß der natürlichen Seltenheiten des k. k. Naturalien Cabinets zu Wien. Erster Theil. Schalthiere. Vindobonæ: Kraus. [1–40] + 1–458 + [1–82]. (in Latin and German language)
- Born, I. E. von (1790). Catalogue Methodique et Raisonne de la Collection des Fossiles de Mlle. Éléonore de Raab. Vienna: J. V. Degen.

== Species described ==
Species described by Ignatius von Born include:

gastropods:

- Bullata bullata (Born, 1778) – synonyms: Voluta bullata Born, 1778; Marginella bullata (Born, 1778)
- Cerithium atratum (Born, 1778) – synonym: Murex atratus Born, 1778
- Cerithium litteratum (Born, 1778) – synonym: Murex litteratus Born, 1778
- Clathrodrillia gibbosa (Born, 1778) – synonyms: Crassispira gibbosa (Born, 1778); Drillia gibbosa (Born, 1778); Murex gibbosus Born, 1778
- Conus centurio Born, 1778
- Conus ermineus Born, 1778 – synonym: Dendroconus ermineus (Born, 1778)
- Fissurella nodosa (Born, 1778) – synonym: Patella nodosa Born, 1778
- Hastula cinerea (Born, 1778) – synonyms: Terebra cinerea (Born, 1778); Buccinum cinereum Born, 1778
- Labyrinthus plicatus (Born, 1780) – synonym: Helix plicata Born, 1780
- Osilinus turbinatus (Born, 1780) – synonym: Trochus turbinatus Born, 1780
- Patella miniata Born, 1778
- Patella oculus Born, 1778
- Prunum marginatum (Born, 1778) – synonym: Voluta marginata Born, 1778
- Scutellastra cochlear (Born, 1778) – synonym: Patella cochlear Born 1778
- Semicassis granulata (Born, 1778) – synonyms: Phalium granulata (Born, 1778); Phalium granulatum (Born, 1778); Buccinum granulatum Born, 1778
- Stigmaulax sulcatus (Born, 1778) – synonym: Nerita sulcata Born, 1778
- Tegula fasciata (Born, 1778) – synonyms: Trochus fasciatus Born, 1778; Chlorostoma fasciata (Born, 1778)
- Thais lacera (Born, 1778) – synonym: Thais lacerus (Born, 1778)
- Trochita trochiformis (Born, 1778) – synonyms: Turbo trochiformis Born, 1778; Patella trochiformis (Born, 1778)
- Vasum muricatum (Born, 1778) – synonyms: Voluta muricata Born, 1778; Turbinella muricatum (Born, 1778)
- Xenophora conchyliophora (Born, 1780) – synonyms: Astraea conchyliophora (Born, 1780); Trochus conchyliophorus Born, 1780

synonyms of gastropods:

- Tritonium costatum (Born, 1778) and Triton costatum (Born, 1778) and Murex costatus Born, 1778 are synonyms for Cymatium parthenopeum (von Salis, 1793)
- Murex gigas Born, 1780 is a synonym for Syrinx aruanus (Linnaeus, 1758)
- Turbo torcularis Born, 1778 is a synonym for Torcula exoleta (Linnaeus, 1758)

bivalves:

- Argopecten nucleus (Born, 1778) – synonyms: Ostrea nucleus Born, 1778; Aequipecten nucleus (Born, 1778); Pecten nucleus (Born, 1778)
- Ctenoides scabra (Born, 1778) – synonyms: Ostrea scabra Born, 1778; Lima scabra (Born, 1778)
- Dosinia concentrica (Born, 1778) – synonyms: Venus concentrica Born, 1778; Cytherea concentrica (Born, 1778); Artemis concentrica (Born, 1778)
- Eurytellina punicea (Born, 1778) – synonym: Tellina punicea Born, 1778
- Gafrarium calipygum (Born, 1778)
- Mactra glauca Born, 1778
- Ostrea cristata Born, 1778
- Panopea glycimeris (Born, 1778)
- Papyridea lata (Born, 1778) – synonym: Cardium latum Born, 1778
- Pitar circinatus (Born, 1778) – synonyms: Venus circinata Born, 1778; Cytherea circinatus (Born, 1778)
- Tellina punicea (Born, 1778)
- Tivela mactroides (Born, 1778) – synonym: Venus mactroides Born, 1778; Cytherea mactroides (Born, 1778)

== See also ==
- List of minerals named after people
