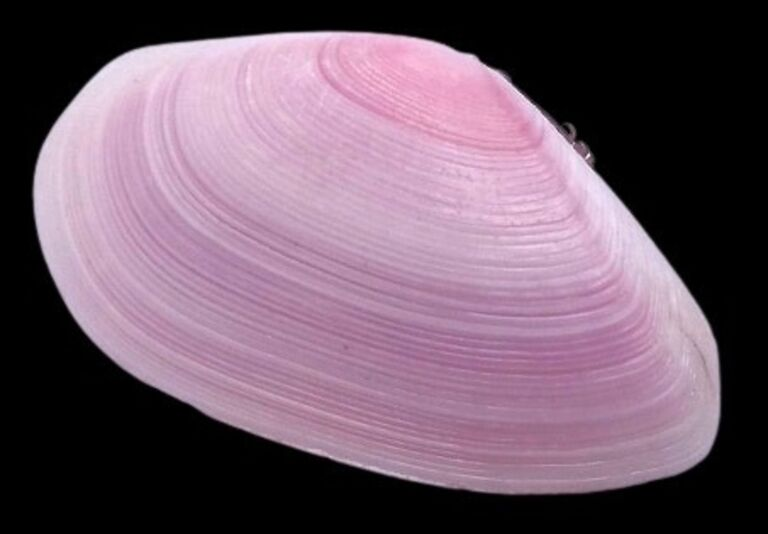

Scientific classification
- Kingdom: Animalia
- Phylum: Mollusca
- Class: Bivalvia
- Order: Cardiida
- Family: Tellinidae
- Genus: Eurytellina
- Species: E. punicea

Binomial name
- Eurytellina punicea (Born, 1778)

Synonyms
- Tellina punicea Born, 1778

= Eurytellina punicea =

Species of bivalve

Eurytellina punicea is a species of bivalves belonging to the family Tellinidae.

The species is found in Central and Southern America.

Right and left valve of the same specimen:

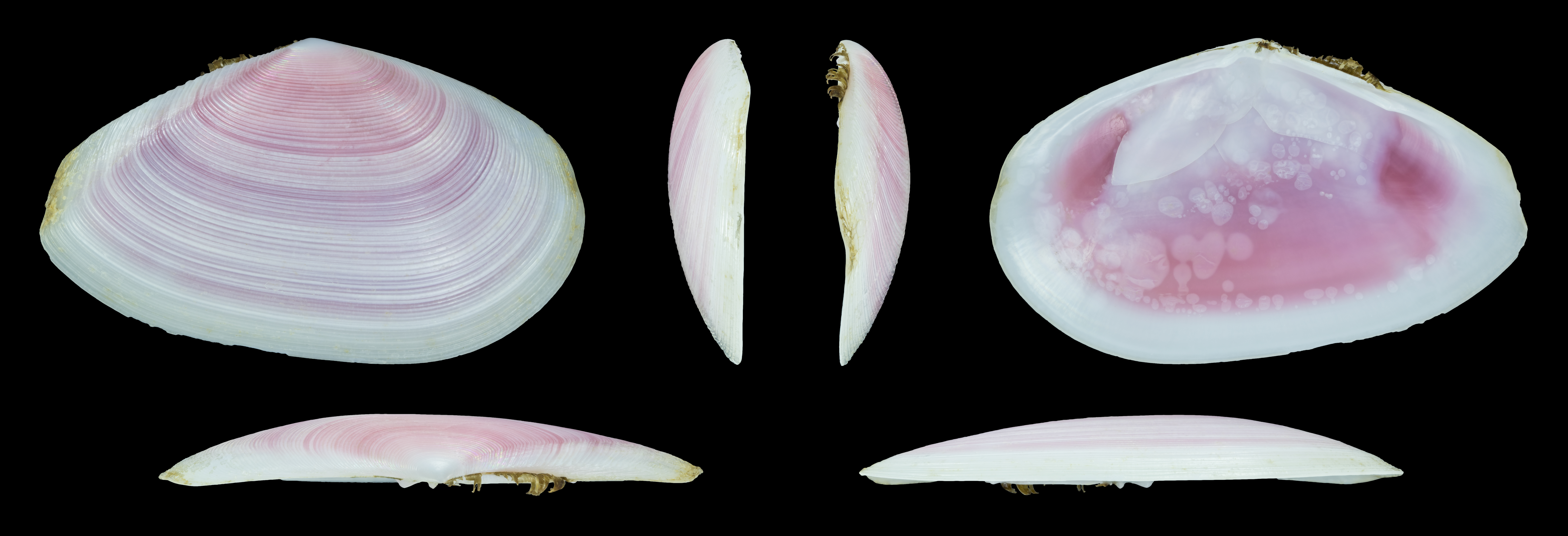
Right valve

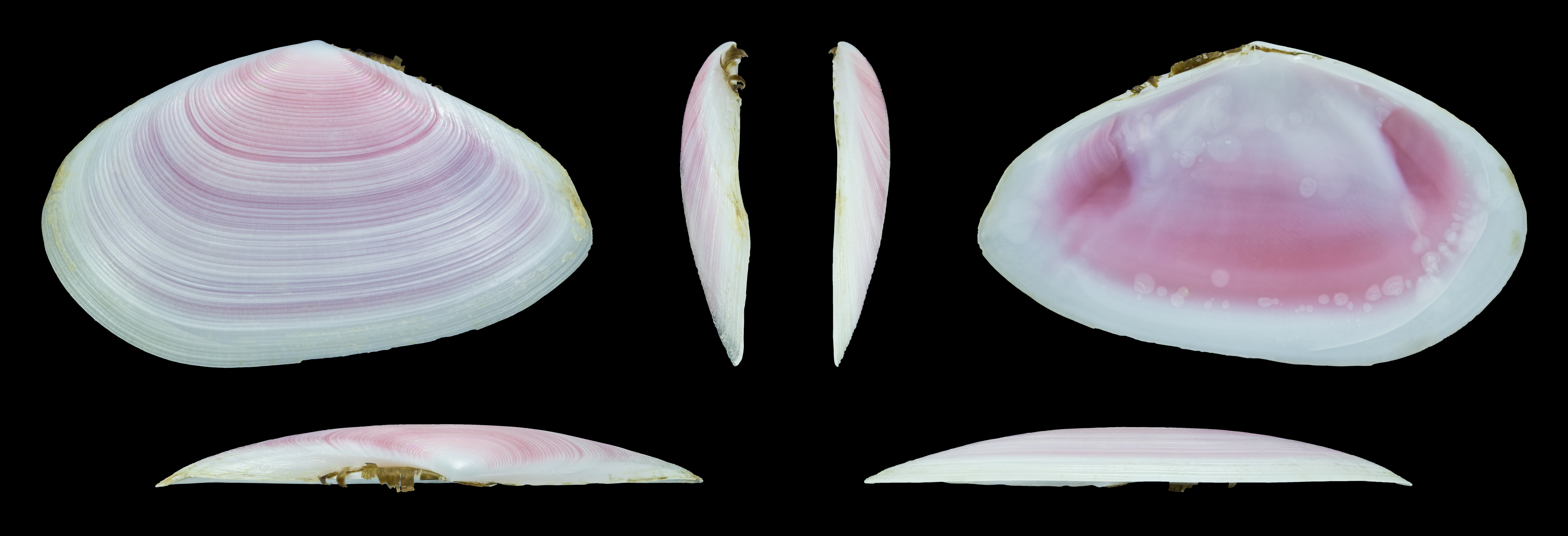
Left valve
