= Worm-snail =

The common name worm-snail (or worm snail, wormsnail, or worm shell) applies to a family and several species of gastropod:

- Vermetidae (family)
  - Dendropoma corallinaceum
  - Thylacodes (genus)
    - Thylacodes aotearoicus
    - Thylacodes natalensis
    - Thylacodes squamigerus
    - Thylacodes zelandicus
- Vermicularia knorrii (common name Florida worm snail)
