= Michael G. Hadfield =

Invertebrate Biologist

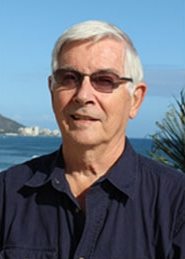
Dr. Michael G. Hadfield outside of Kewalo Marine Laboratory

Michael Gale Hadfield is an invertebrate biologist and professor emeritus at the University of Hawaiʻi at Mānoa. His research has focused on the larvae of marine invertebrates and native tree snails in Hawai'i. He retired in 2013, but has remained active in research and was recognized in 2023 as one of the top ecology and evolutionary scientists in the U.S. and the world.

== Biography ==
=== Education ===
Michael G. Hadfield was born in 1937. He attended the University of Washington where he earned both a B.A. and M.S. in Zoology. Hadfield was awarded a Fulbright Fellowship, which allowed him to study in the marine laboratory of the University of Copenhagen under famed larval biologist Gunnar Thorson. He obtained his PhD in Biological Sciences at Stanford University. After completing his PhD in 1966, Hadfield taught at Pomona College until 1968, when he moved to Hawai'i to accept a faculty position at the University of Hawai'i. He was hired as part of the inaugural faculty at the Kewalo Marine Laboratory, a unit in the Pacific Biomedical Research Center, which was completed 4 years after he arrived in Hawai'i. Hadfield served as the director of the Kewalo Marine Laboratory for 11 years, from 1996 to 2007.

=== Research and publications ===
Hadfield's research on reproduction and development focused on marine gastropods and worms, and later, terrestrial snails in the Pacific which included many endemic Hawaiian tree snails. After extensive fieldwork revealed that the snails were rapidly disappearing, one of Hadfield's major projects included a captive-rearing facility where the snails could be rescued and grown into populations that could re-introduce snails back into the wild. His research on Achatinella was pivotal in ensuring that all species in this genus were protected under the Endangered Species Act in 1982.

In 1972, Hadfield described several Hawaiian species in the family Vermetidae, including Petaloconchus keenae, Dendropoma gregarium, Cupolaconcha meroclista, Dendropoma psarocephalum and Thylacodes variabilis, with E. Alison Kay. He was a plenary speaker at the annual conference of the Australian Marine Sciences Association in July 2003.

Thylacodes hadfieldi is a species of marine gastropod in the family Vermetidae that was described by Walter C. Kelly III in 2007, and named after Michael G. Hadfield. This species is known only to occur on the central east coast of Guam.

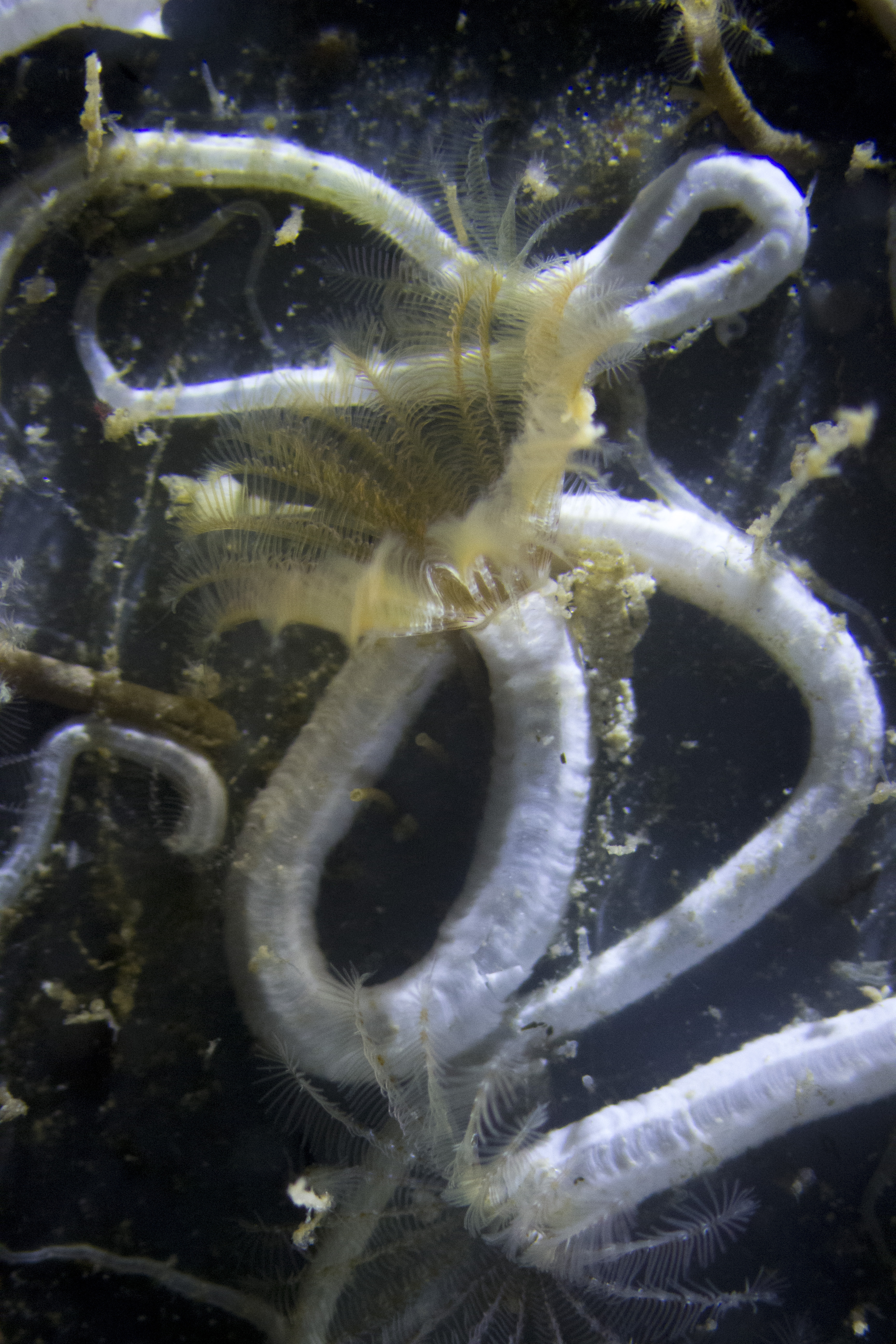
Hydroides elegans adults in tubes.

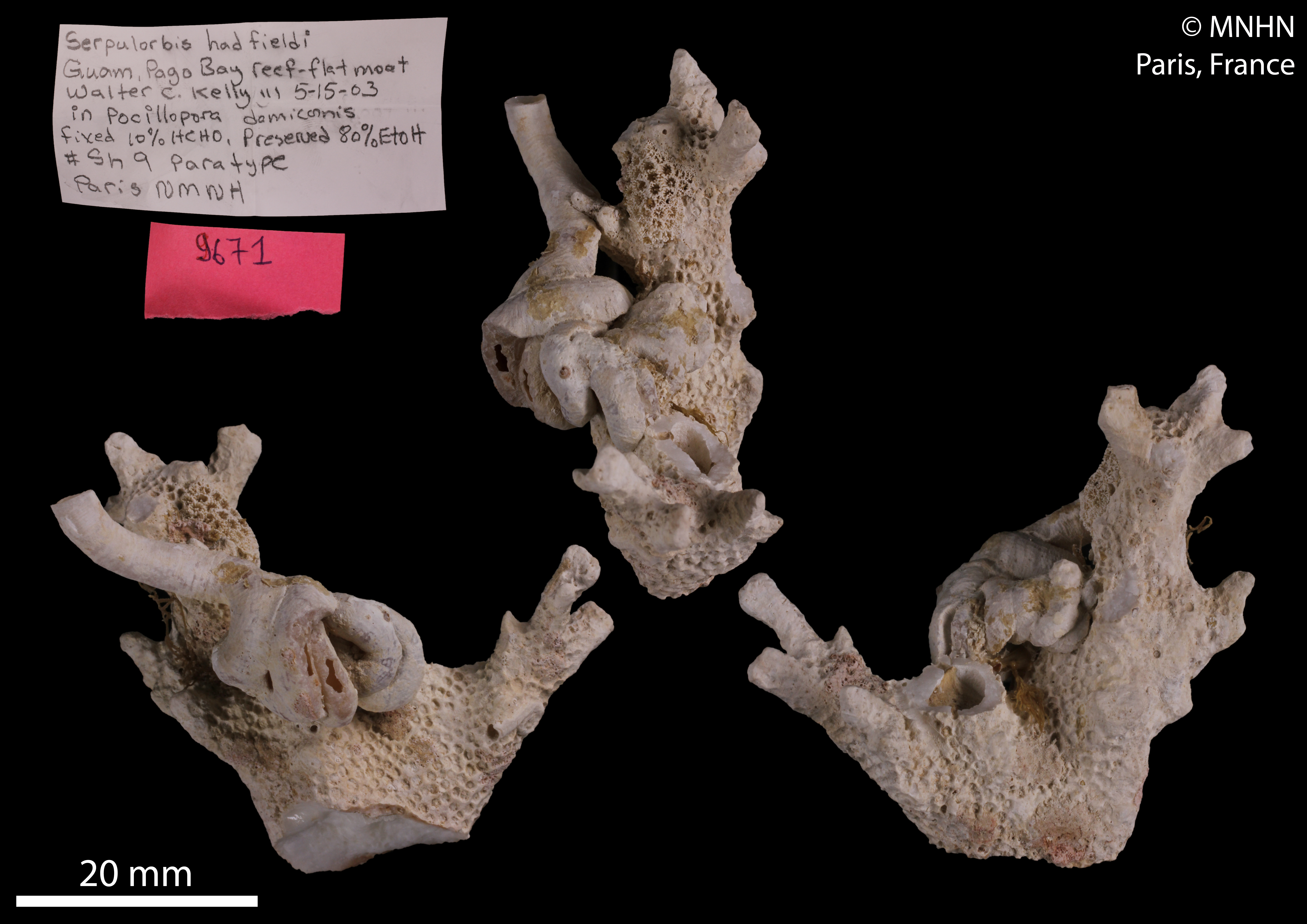

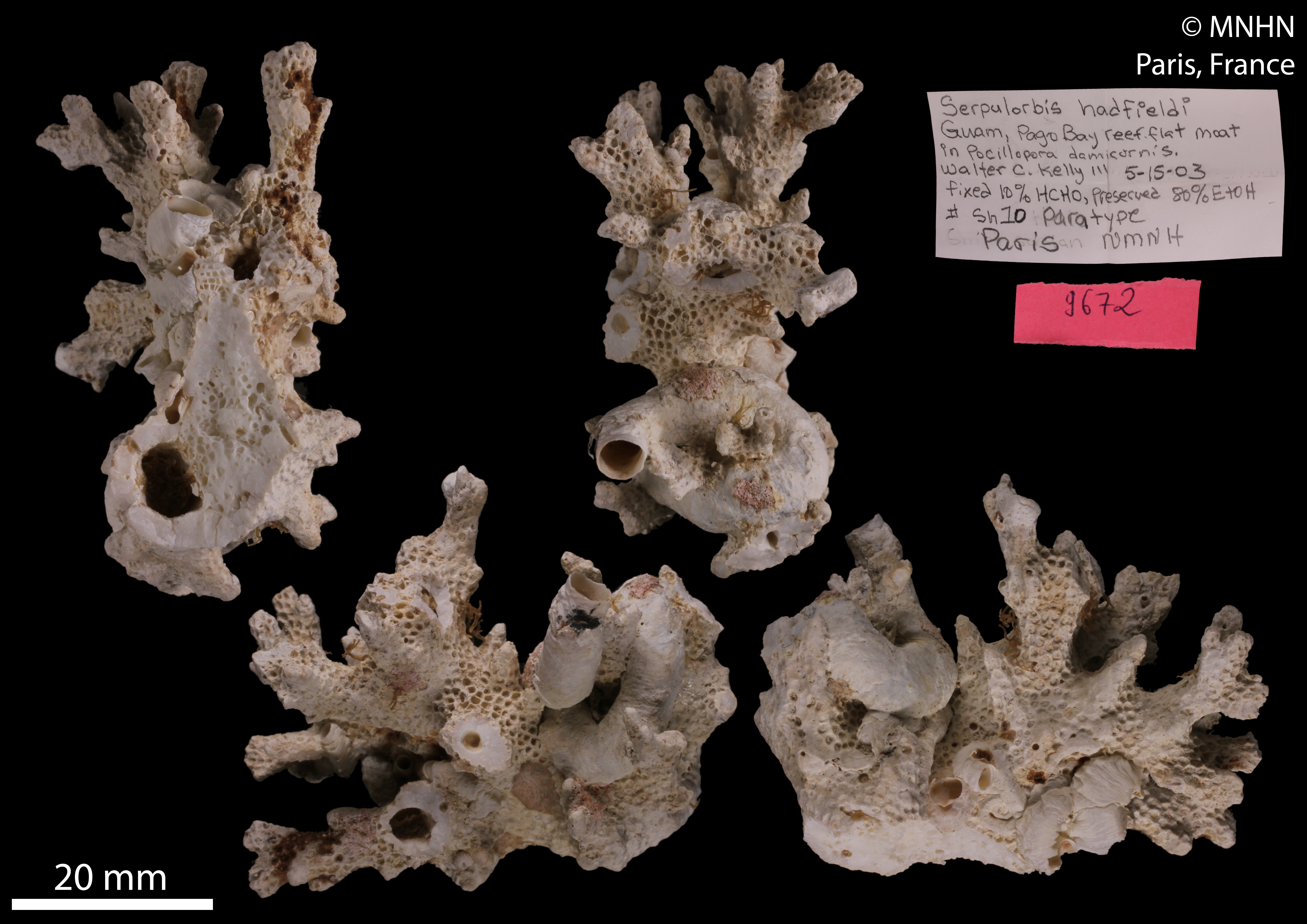

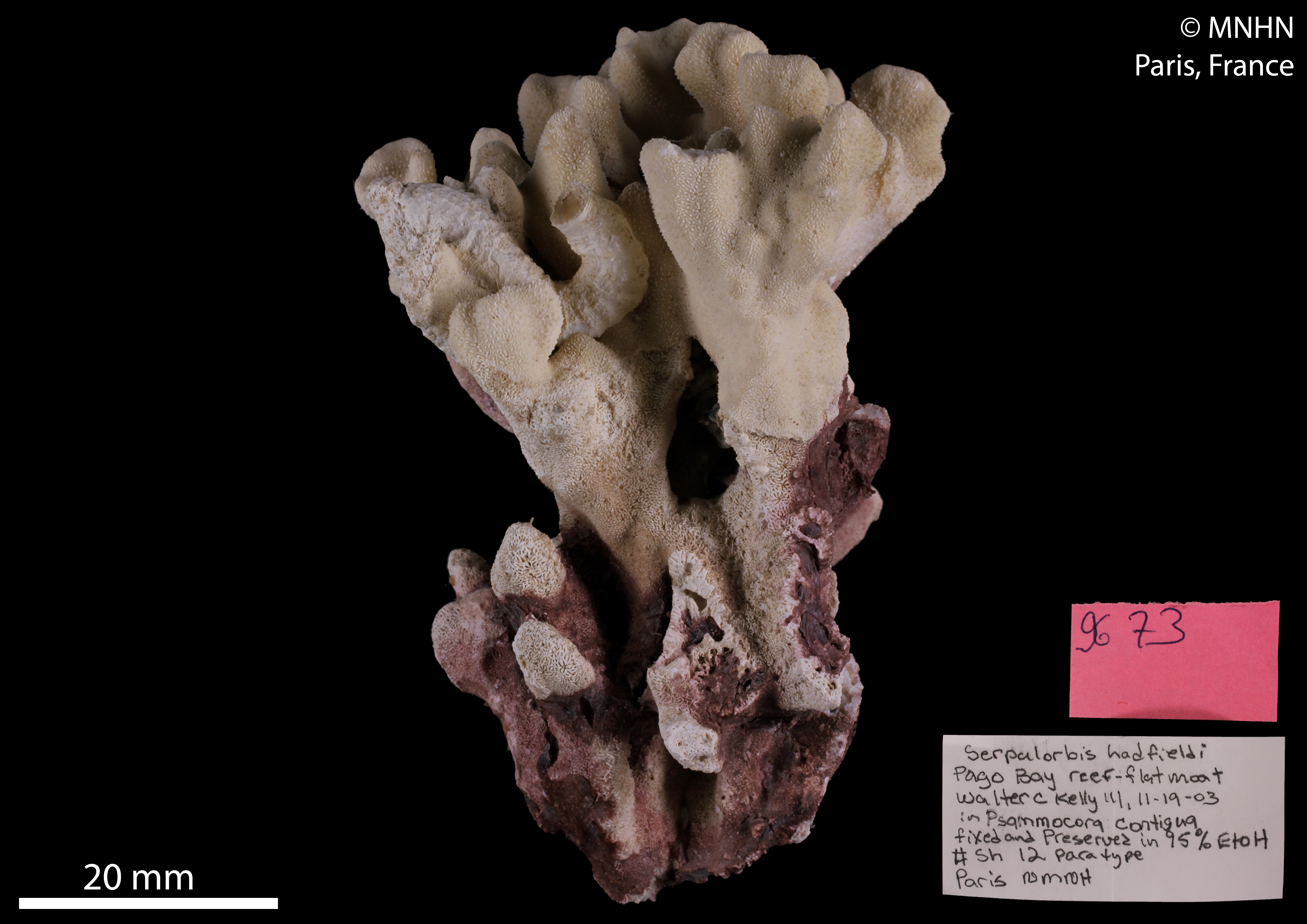

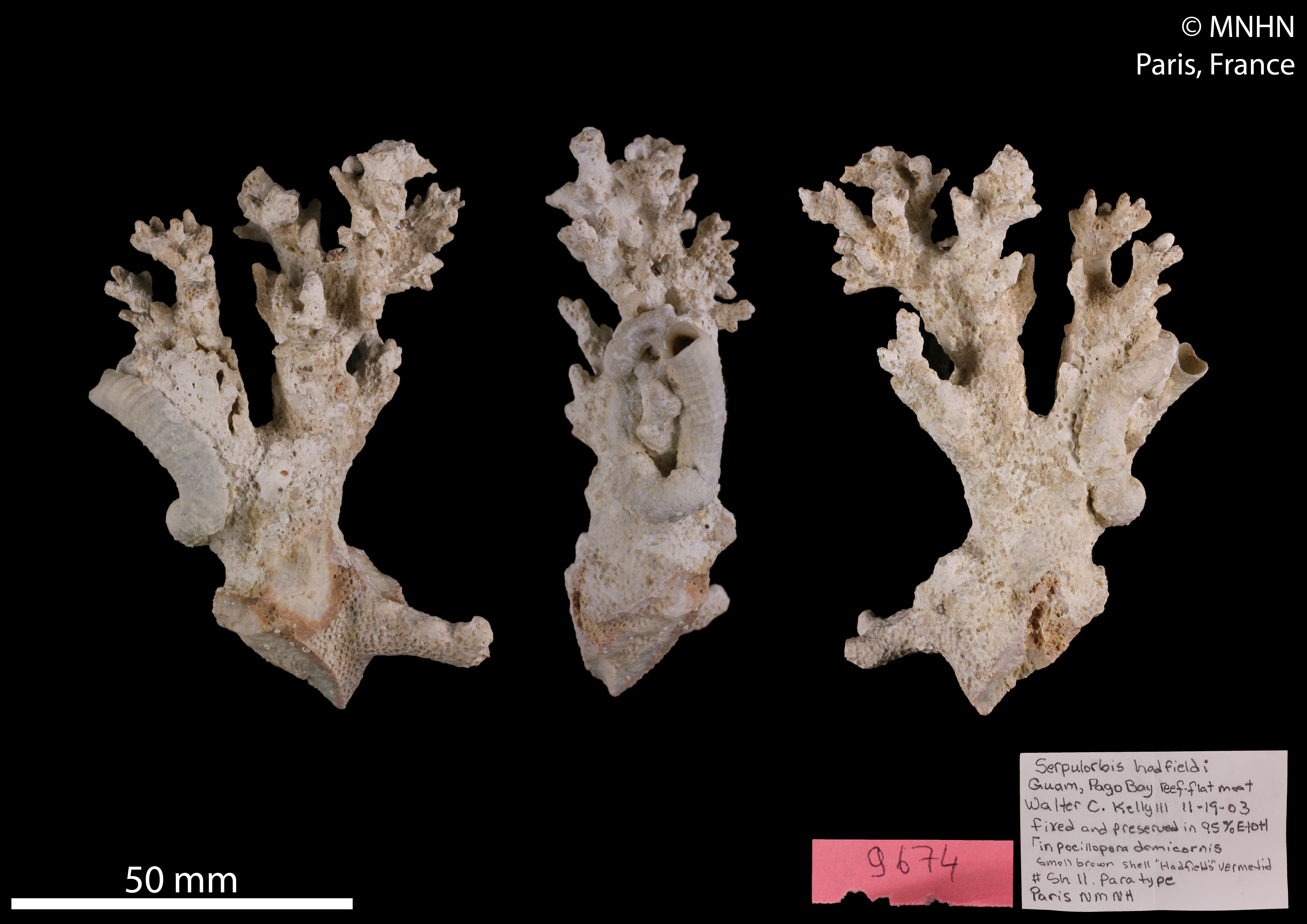

For the last 30 years, Hadfield and colleagues have pioneered investigations of the molecular signaling by which bacteria induce larvae of marine organisms, particularly Hydroides elegans, to settle and metamorphose.

=== Community contributions ===
==== Captive breeding program: Hawaiian tree snails ====
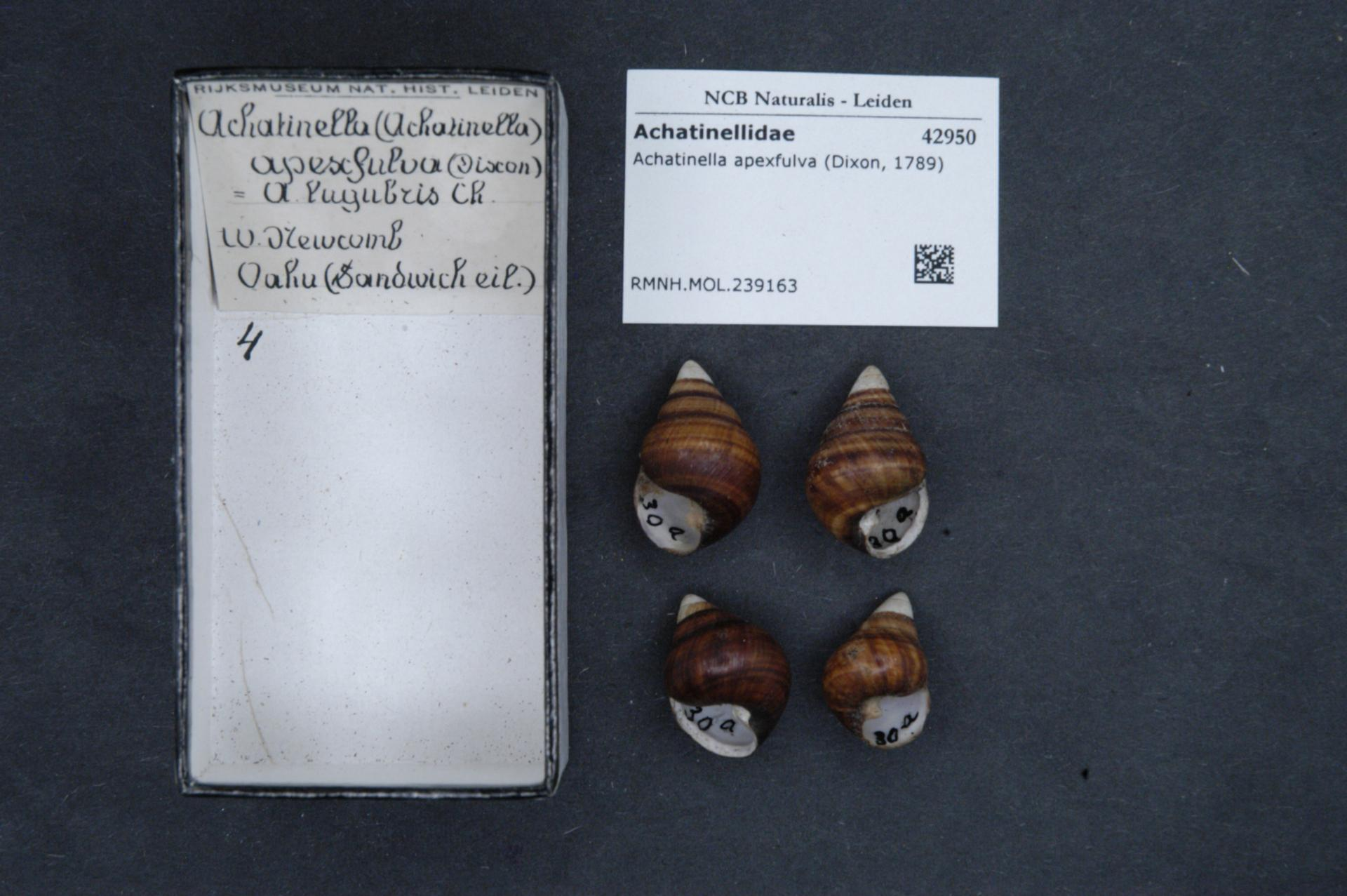
Preserved specimens of Achatinella apexfulva (Dixon, 1789)

In 1989, he established a captive breeding program for Hawaiian tree snails. In 1997, the last few individuals of the now extinct species, Achatinella apexfulva were collected. Unfortunately, the last remaining individual of this species, a 14 year old snail named "George" died on New Year's Day 2019.

==== Pahole Natural Area Reserve ====
In 1998, Hadfield urged the state of Hawai'i to build exclosures in the Pahole Natural Area Reserve. The exclosure helped to protect the remaining species of Achatinella by preventing predators such as the rat and the rosy wolf snail from entering the sensitive habitat.

===== Pagan Island tree snail survey =====
In 2010, Hadfield visited Pagan Island in the Mariana archipelago to perform a survey of the island for tree snails. The critically endangered species Partula gibba was of particular interest for this study. He became a vocal opponent of the US Navy's plan to establish a live-fire training range on the island of Pagan. He expressed concerns about the impacts on the biodiversity of the island that would be caused by live-fire training, and he noted that Pagan was inhabited by local people and considered to be their homeland. In 2013, Hadfield wrote an open letter opposing the US Navy' plans. On April 2, 2014, he led a talk titled "Environmental Issues of the Mariana Islands", which was held at the Kewalo Marine Laboratory, where he discussed the biodiversity of the island of Pagan and the live-fire training range plans of the U.S. Navy.

In 2022, Hadfield and other experts discussed the extinction crisis of the Hawaiian tree snails in an audio documentary. He emphasized the destructive impacts caused by invasive introduced predators like the rat, and the rosy wolf snail.

===== Established programs =====
Hadfield was a co-director for a National Science Foundation funded program, Environmental Biology for Pacific Islanders, which helped students focus on conservation of native species and species habitats through hands-on learning

=== Awards and honors ===
In 2014, Hadfield was the first recipient of the M. Patricia Morse Award for Excellence and Innovation in Science Education by the Society for Integrative and Comparative Biology.
