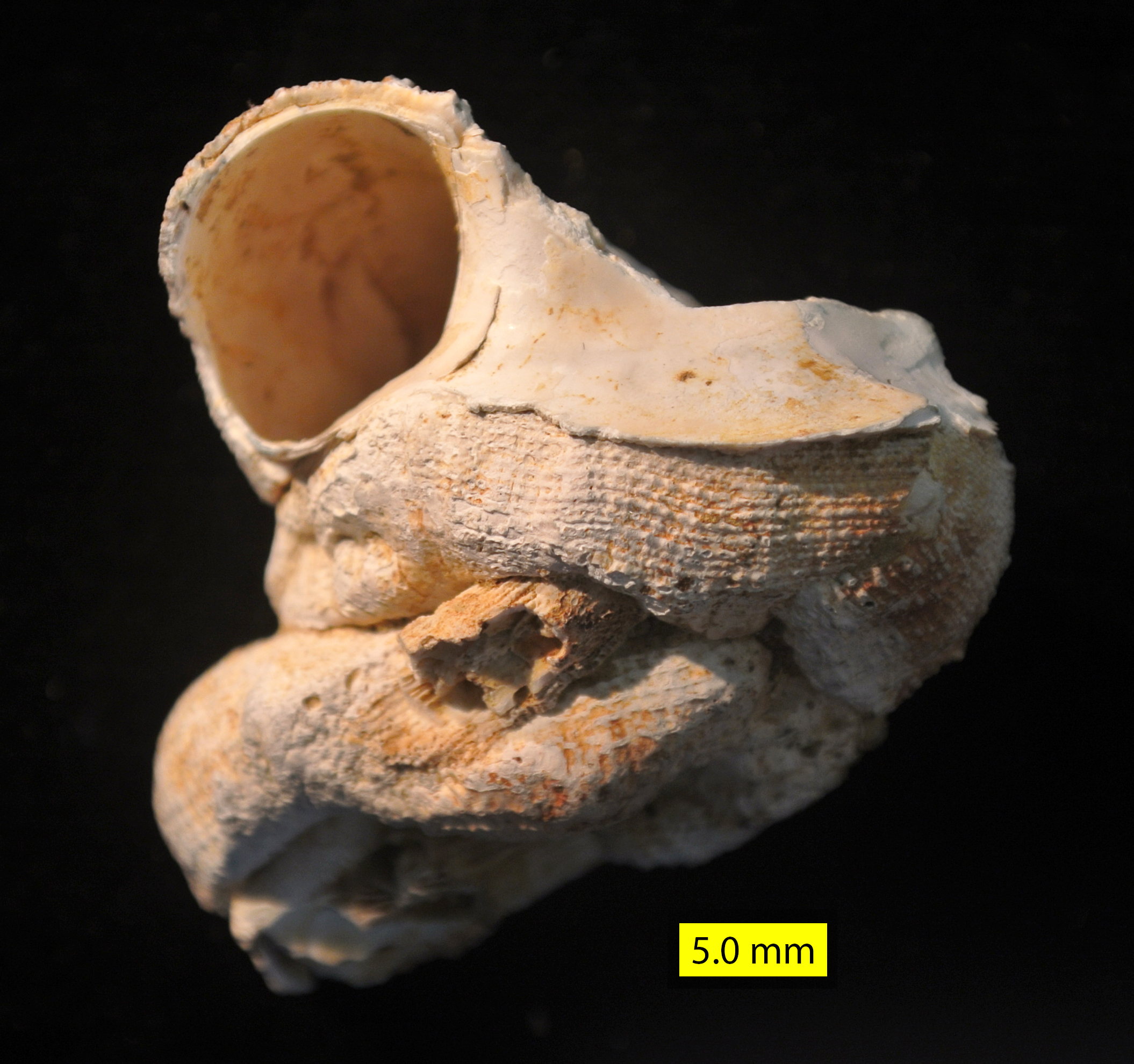
- Vermetus sp., Nicosia Formation, Pliocene, Cyprus

Scientific classification
- Kingdom: Animalia
- Phylum: Mollusca
- Class: Gastropoda
- Subclass: Caenogastropoda
- Order: Littorinimorpha
- Family: Vermetidae
- Genus: Vermetus; Daudin, 1800

Type species
- *Vermetus adansonii Daudin, 1800

Synonyms
- Thylaeodus Mörch, 1860

= Vermetus =

Vermetus Temporal range: Jurassic–Recent

Genus of gastropods

Vermetus is a genus of sea snails, marine gastropod mollusks in the family Vermetidae, the worm snails or worm shells.

The genus Vermetus is very ancient: it occurs in the fossil record from the Jurassic to the Quaternary (age range: from 164.7 to 0.0 million years ago).

== Species ==
Species within the genus Vermetus include:

- Vermetus adansonii Daudin, 1800
- Vermetus afer (Gmelin, 1791)
- Vermetus annulus Rousseau in Chenu, 1843
- Vermetus balanitintinnabuli Mörch, 1862
- Vermetus bieleri Scuderi, Swinnen & Templado, 2017
- Vermetus biperforatus Bieler, Collins, Golding & Rawlings, 2019
- Vermetus brasiliensis Rousseau in Chenu, 1844
- Vermetus carinatus Quoy & Gaimard, 1834
- Vermetus dentiferus Rousseau in Chenu, 1844
- Vermetus enderli Schiaparelli & Metivier, 2000
- Vermetus eruca (Lamarck, 1818) (taxon inquirendum)
- Vermetus granulatus (Gravenhorst, 1831)
- Vermetus intestinalis (Gmelin, 1791) (taxon inquirendum)
- Vermetus periscopium Barnard, 1963
- Vermetus reticulatus Quoy & Gaimard, 1834
- Vermetus sansibaricus Thiele, 1925
- Vermetus scaber Gravenhorst, 1831
- Vermetus tonganus Quoy & Gaimard, 1834
- Vermetus triquetrus Bivona Ant., 1832
- Vermetus turonius Rousseau in Chenu, 1844
- Vermetus vitreus Kuroda & Habe, 1972

Species brought into synonymy

- Vermetus alii Hadfield & Kay, 1972: synonym of Eualetes tulipa (Rousseau in Chenu, 1843) (subjective synonym)
- Vermetus annulatus Costa, 1861: synonym of Filogranula annulata (O. G. Costa, 1861)
- Vermetus calyculatus Costa, 1861: synonym of Filogranula calyculata (O. G. Costa, 1861)
- Vermetus cariniferus Gray, 1843: synonym of Spirobranchus carinifer (Gray, 1843)
- Vermetus centiquadrus Valenciennes, 1846: synonym of Eualetes centiquadrus (Valenciennes, 1846)
- Vermetus cristatus Biondi, 1857: synonym of Dendropoma petraeum
- Vermetus cyclicus Watson, 1886: synonym of Ctiloceras cyclicum (Watson, 1886)
- Vermetus gigas Bivona in Philippi, 1836: synonym of Serpulorbis arenarius
- Vermetus goreensis (Gmelin, 1791): synonym of Vermetidae incertae sedis goreensis (Gmelin, 1791)
- Vermetus indentatus (Carpenter, 1857): synonym of Thylaeodus indentatus (Carpenter, 1857)
- Vermetus knorrii Deshayes, 1843: synonym of Vermicularia knorrii (Deshayes, 1843)
- Vermetus masier Deshayes, 1843: synonym of Thylacodes masier (Deshayes, 1843) (original combination)
- Vermetus mutabilis Costa, 1861: synonym of Filogranula calyculata (O. G. Costa, 1861)
- Vermetus peronii Valenciennes, A., 1846: synonym of Eualetes centiquadrus (Valenciennes, 1846)
- Vermetus quadrangulus Philippi, 1848: synonym of Vermicularia spirata (Philippi, 1836)
- Vermetus quincunx Barnard, 1963: synonym of Stephopoma quincunx (Barnard, 1963)
- Vermetus quinquecostatus Daudin, 1800: synonym of Spirobranchus lima (Grube, 1862)
- Vermetus radilula Stimpson, 1851: synonym of Vermicularia radicula (Stimpson, 1851)
- Vermetus roseus Quoy & Gaimard, 1834: synonym of Stephopoma roseum (Quoy & Gaimard)
- Vermetus rugulosus Monterosato, 1878: synonym of Thylaeodus rugulosus (Monterosato, 1878) (original combination)
- Vermetus selectus (Monterosato, 1892): synonym of Thylacodes arenarius (Linnaeus, 1758)
- Vermetus semisurrectus Bivona Ant., 1832: synonym of Thylaeodus semisurrectus (Bivona-Bernardi, 1832) (original combination)
- Vermetus spiratus Philippi, 1836: synonym of Vermicularia spirata (Philippi, 1836)
- Vermetus tridentatus Daudin, 1800: synonym of Placostegus tridentatus (Fabricius, 1779)
