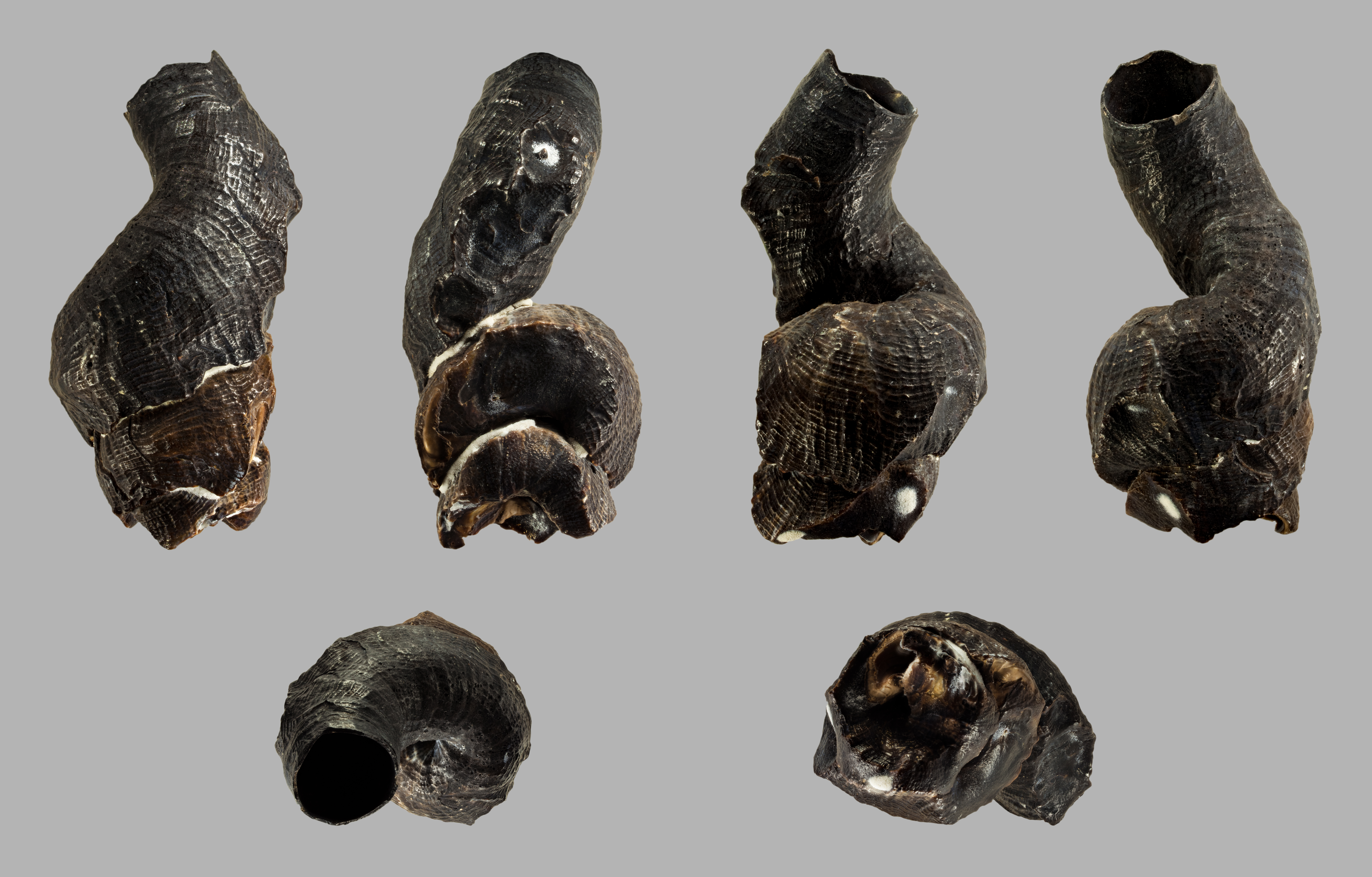
- Thylacodes colubrinus shell

Scientific classification
- Kingdom: Animalia
- Phylum: Mollusca
- Class: Gastropoda
- Subclass: Caenogastropoda
- Order: Littorinimorpha
- Family: Vermetidae
- Genus: Thylacodes
- Species: T. colubrinus

Binomial name
- Thylacodes colubrinus (Röding, 1798)

Synonyms
- Serpula colubrina Röding, 1798; Serpula fuscata Sowerby I, 1825; Serpula ocrea Gmelin, 1791; Serpulorbis colubrinus (Röding, 1798); Vermetus ater Rousseau in Chenu, 1844

= Thylacodes colubrinus =

Species of gastropod

Thylacodes colubrinus is a species of sea snail, a marine gastropod mollusk in the family Vermetidae, the worm snails or worm shells. This species was previously known as Serpulorbis colubrinus.
