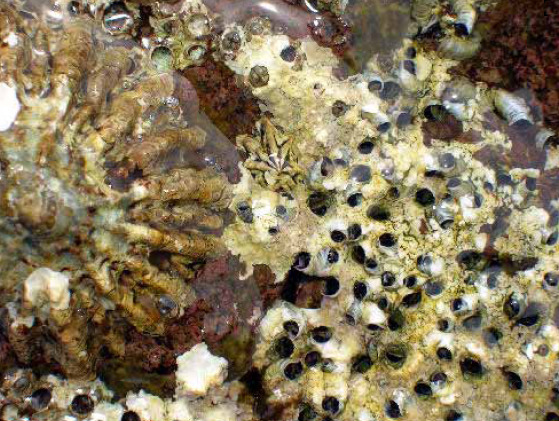
- Dendropoma petraeum

Scientific classification
- Kingdom: Animalia
- Phylum: Mollusca
- Class: Gastropoda
- Subclass: Caenogastropoda
- Order: Littorinimorpha
- Family: Vermetidae
- Subfamily: Dendrioimatinae
- Genus: Dendropoma; Mörch, 1861

Species
- See text.

Synonyms
- Bivonia Gray, 1842; Siphonium Gray, 1850; Veristoa Iredale, 1937; Vermetus (Bivonia) Gray, 1842

= Dendropoma =

Genus of gastropods

Dendropoma is a genus of irregularly coiled sea snails known as "worm shells" or "worm snails". These are marine gastropod molluscs in the family Vermetidae, the worm snails.

== Species ==
According to the World Register of Marine Species (WoRMS), the following species with valid names are included within the genus Dendropoma :

- Dendropoma andamanicum (Prashad & Rao, 1933)
- Dendropoma anguliferum (Monterosato, 1884)
- Dendropoma corallinaceum (Tomlin, 1939)
- Dendropoma corrodens (d’Orbigny, 1842) - ringed wormsnail
- Dendropoma cristatum (Biondi-Giunti, 1859)
- Dendropoma gaederopi Mörch, 1861
- Dendropoma ghanaense Keen & Morton, 1960
- Dendropoma gregarium Hadfield & Kay, 1972
- Dendropoma irregulare (d’Orbigny, 1842) - irregular wormsnail
- Dendropoma lituella (Mörch, 1861) - flat wormsnail
- Dendropoma marchadi Keen & Morton, 1960
- Dendropoma maximum Sowerby I, 1825
- Dendropoma mejillonense Pacheco & Laudien, 2008
- Dendropoma meroclista Hadfield & Kay, 1972
- Dendropoma nebulosum (Dillwyn, 1817)
- Dendropoma planatum (Suter, 1913)
- Dendropoma psarocephala Hadfield & Kay, 1972
- Dendropoma rastrum (Mörch, 1861) - California wormsnail
- Dendropoma rhyssoconcha Hadfield & Kay, 1972
- Dendropoma squamiferum Ponder, 1967
- Dendropoma tholia Keen & Morton, 1960

Species brought into synonymy

- Dendropoma annulatus auct.: synonym of Dendropoma corrodens (d’Orbigny, 1841)
- Dendropoma gregaria [sic] : synonym of Dendropoma gregarium Hadfield & Kay, 1972
- Dendropoma mejillonensis [sic]: synonym of Dendropoma mejillonense Pacheco & Laudien, 2008
- Dendropoma petraeum (Monterosato, 1884): synonym of Dendropoma cristatum (Biondi, 1857)
