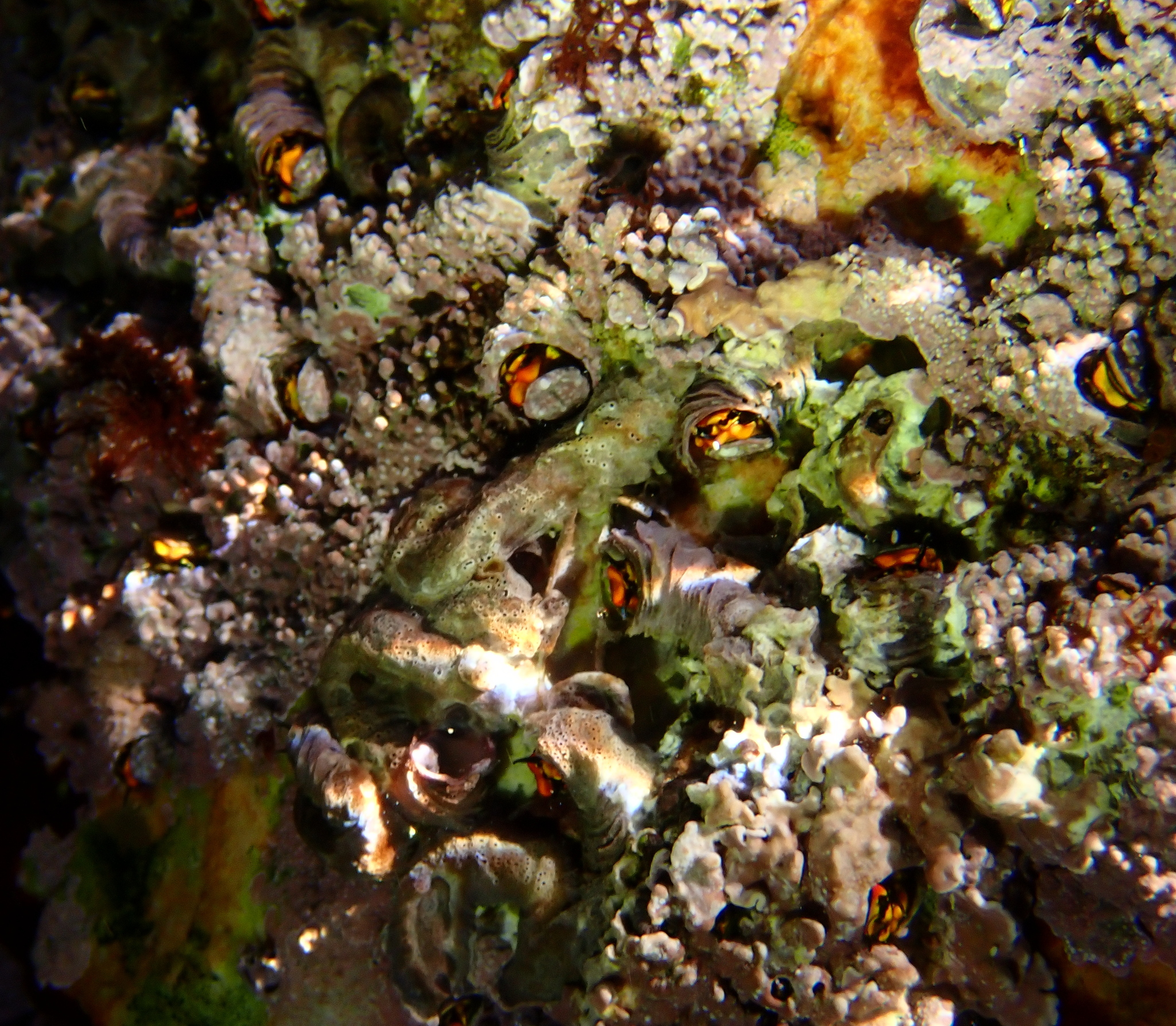

Scientific classification
- Kingdom: Animalia
- Phylum: Mollusca
- Class: Gastropoda
- Subclass: Caenogastropoda
- Order: Littorinimorpha
- Family: Vermetidae
- Genus: Novastoa
- Species: N. lamellosa

Binomial name
- Novastoa lamellosa (Hutton, 1873)

Synonyms
- Siphonium lamellosum Hutton, 1873

= Novastoa lamellosa =

Species of gastropod

Novastoa lamellosa is a species of sea snail, a marine gastropod mollusc in the family Vermetidae, the worm snails.
