= Dendropoma gaederopi =

Scientific classification
- Kingdom: Animalia
- Phylum: Mollusca
- Class: Gastropoda
- Subclass: Caenogastropoda
- Order: Littorinimorpha
- Family: Vermetidae
- Genus: Dendropoma
- Species: D. gaederopi

Binomial name
- Dendropoma gaederopi Mörch, 1861

Synonyms
- Serpula turboides Chiereghini in Siebold, 1850

Species of gastropod

Dendropoma gaederopi is a species of sea snail, a marine gastropod mollusk in the family Vermetidae, the worm snails or worm shells.

== Description ==
- Shell: The shell of Siphonium gaederopi is small and white, with a spiral shape. The shell is covered in a thin layer of periostracum, which is made of a protein called conchiolin. The periostracum is brown or black in color, and it helps to protect the shell from damage.
- Foot: The foot of Siphonium gaederopi is long and slender, and it is used for crawling and burrowing. The foot is also used for feeding, as the snail uses it to scoop up food from the seafloor.
- Head: The head of Siphonium gaederopi is small and round, and it has two eyes. The eyes are used for seeing, and they help the snail to navigate its environment.
- Mouth: The mouth of Siphonium gaederopi is located on the underside of the head. The mouth is used for eating, and it is equipped with a radula, which is a ribbon-like structure that is covered in teeth. The radula is used to scrape food off of rocks and other surfaces.

== Distribution ==
Siphonium gaederopi is found in the tropical waters of the Indo-Pacific region. It is a common species, and it can be found in a variety of habitats, including coral reefs, seagrass beds, and mudflats.
