= Thylacodes sipho =

Common worm-shell

Scientific classification
- Kingdom: Animalia
- Phylum: Mollusca
- Class: Gastropoda
- Subclass: Caenogastropoda
- Order: Littorinimorpha
- Family: Vermetidae
- Genus: Thylacodes
- Species: T. sipho

Binomial name
- Thylacodes sipho (Lamarck 1818)

Synonyms
- Vermetus decussatus Gmelin, 1791; Serpula sipho Lamarck, 1818; Serpula sulcata Lamarck, 1818; Vermetus dentiferus Lamarck, 1818; Vermetus arenarius Quoy & Gaimard, 1834; Thylacodes dentiferus repens Mörch, 1862; Vermetus longifilis Mörch, 1862

Species of gastropod

Thylacodes sipho, the common worm-shell, is a species of sea snail, a worm shell, a marine gastropod mollusc in the family Vermetidae, the worm snails.

== Distribution ==
Endemic to Australia, found in all coastal states, more common in the south. The habitat is subtidal exposed reefs and rock platforms.

== Description ==
Living in an irregularly coiled shell, up to 70 mm long, with a tube diameter of 4 to 10 mm. The early whorls of the shell are attached to a substrate such as rocks or shells, sometimes in aggregated groups. Feeding is on organic matter, trapped in strings of mucous, there is no operculum.
