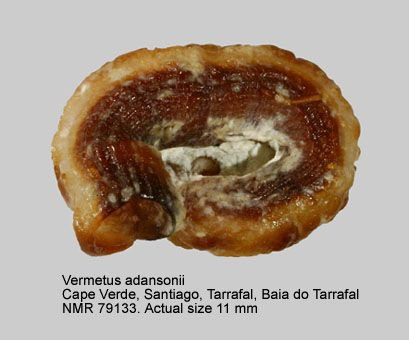
- Vermetus adansonii Daudin, c.1800

Scientific classification
- Kingdom: Animalia
- Phylum: Mollusca
- Class: Gastropoda
- Subclass: Caenogastropoda
- Order: Littorinimorpha
- Family: Vermetidae
- Genus: Vermetus
- Species: V. adansonii

Binomial name
- Vermetus adansonii (Daudin, 1800)

Synonyms
- Petaloconchus adansonii (Daudin, 1800) (incorrect generic placement); Serpula lumbricalis Linnaeus, 1758; Serpula vermetus Sowerby & Sowerby, 1820/25; Vermicularia vermetus Bosc, 1801

= Vermetus adansonii =

Species of gastropod

Vermetus adansonii is a species of sea snail, a marine gastropod mollusk in the family Vermetidae, the worm snails or worm shells.
