= Thylacodes inopertus =

Scientific classification
- Kingdom: Animalia
- Phylum: Mollusca
- Class: Gastropoda
- Subclass: Caenogastropoda
- Order: Littorinimorpha
- Family: Vermetidae
- Genus: Thylacodes
- Species: T. inopertus

Binomial name
- Thylacodes inopertus (Leuckart in Rüppell & Leuckart, 1828)

Species of gastropod

Thylacodes inopertus is a species of sea snail, a marine gastropod mollusk in the family Vermetidae, the worm snails or worm shells. This species was previously known as Serpulorbis inopertus.
