= Thylacodes squamolineatus =

Scientific classification
- Kingdom: Animalia
- Phylum: Mollusca
- Class: Gastropoda
- Subclass: Caenogastropoda
- Order: Littorinimorpha
- Family: Vermetidae
- Genus: Thylacodes
- Species: T. squamolineatus

Binomial name
- Thylacodes squamolineatus Petuch, 2002

Synonyms
- Serpulorbus squamolineatus Petuch, 2002

Species of gastropod

Thylacodes squamolineatus is a species of sea snail, a marine gastropod mollusk in the family Vermetidae, the worm snails or worm shells.

== Description ==
The maximum recorded shell length is 60 mm.

== Habitat ==
The minimum recorded depth for this species is 400 m; the maximum recorded depth is 400 m.
