= Thylacodes riisei =

Scientific classification
- Kingdom: Animalia
- Phylum: Mollusca
- Class: Gastropoda
- Subclass: Caenogastropoda
- Order: Littorinimorpha
- Family: Vermetidae
- Genus: Thylacodes
- Species: T. riisei

Binomial name
- Thylacodes riisei (Mörch, 1862)

Species of gastropod

Thylacodes riisei is a species of sea snail, a marine gastropod mollusk in the family Vermetidae, the worm snails or worm shells. This species was previously known as Serpulorbis riisei.

== Description ==
The maximum recorded shell length is 37 mm.

== Habitat ==
The minimum recorded depth for this species is 0 m; maximum recorded depth is 2 m.
