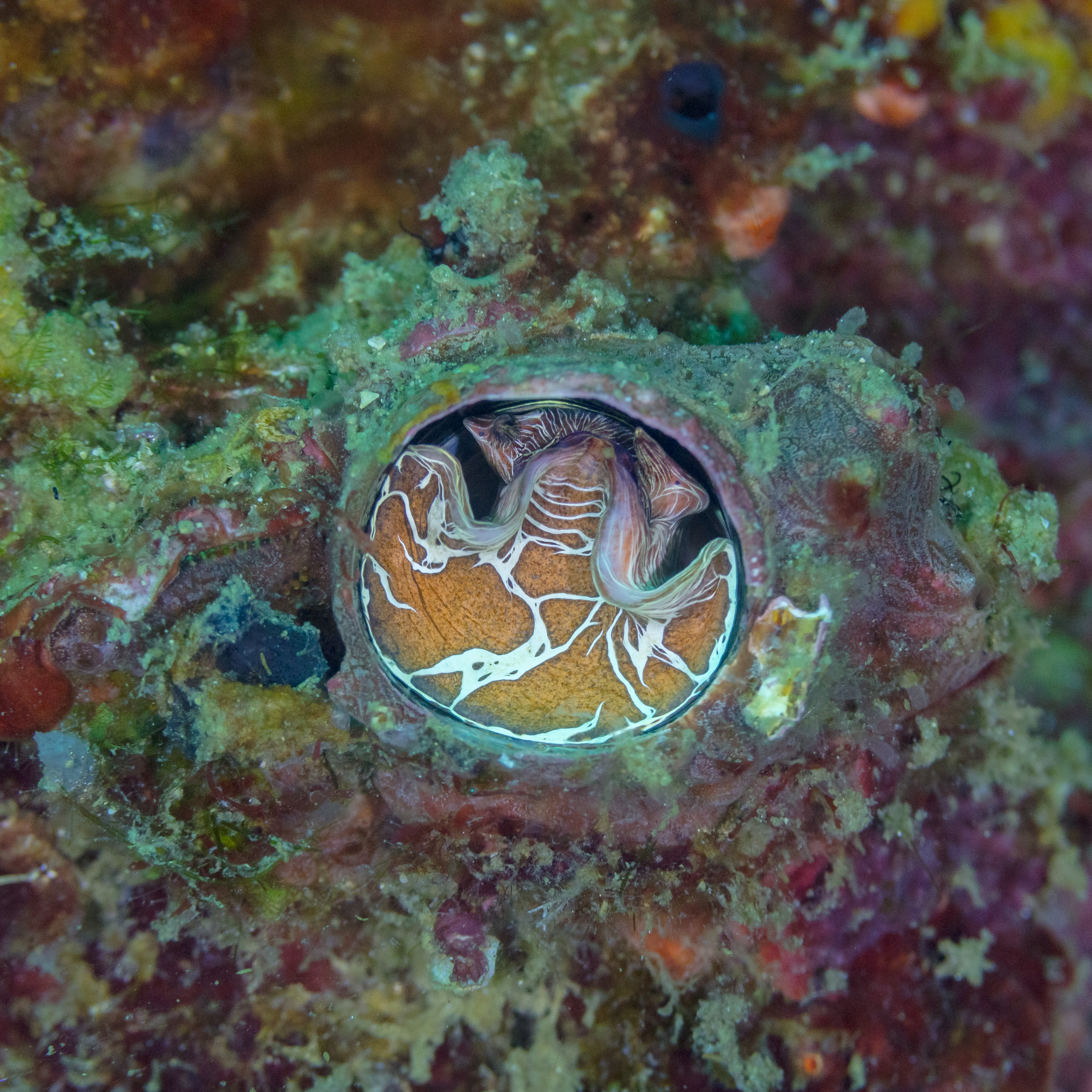

Scientific classification
- Kingdom: Animalia
- Phylum: Mollusca
- Class: Gastropoda
- Subclass: Caenogastropoda
- Order: Littorinimorpha
- Family: Vermetidae
- Genus: Thylacodes
- Species: T. grandis

Binomial name
- Thylacodes grandis (Gray, 1842)

= Thylacodes grandis =

Species of gastropod

Thylacodes grandis is a species of gastropods belonging to the family Vermetidae.

The species is found in Malesia.
