= Eualetes =

Scientific classification
- Kingdom: Animalia
- Phylum: Mollusca
- Class: Gastropoda
- Subclass: Caenogastropoda
- Order: Littorinimorpha
- Family: Vermetidae
- Genus: Eualetes; Keen, 1971

Type species
- Vermetus centiquadrus Valenciennes, 1846

Synonyms
- Tripsycha (Eualetes)

Genus of gastropods

Eualetes is a genus of sea snails, marine gastropod mollusks in the family Vermetidae, the worm snails or worm shells.

== Species ==
Species within the genus Eualetes include:

- Eualetes centiquadrus (Valenciennes, 1846)
- Eualetes tulipa (Chenu, 1843)

Species brought into synonymy

- Eualetes tulipa (Chenu, 1843): synonym of Eualetes tulipa (Rousseau in Chenu, 1843)
