= Cerithiovermetus aqabensis =

Scientific classification
- Kingdom: Animalia
- Phylum: Mollusca
- Class: Gastropoda
- Subclass: Caenogastropoda
- Order: Littorinimorpha
- Family: Vermetidae
- Genus: Cerithiovermetus
- Species: C. aqabensis

Binomial name
- Cerithiovermetus aqabensis Bandel, 2006

Species of gastropod

Cerithiovermetus aqabensis is a species of sea snail, a marine gastropod mollusk in the family Vermetidae, the worm snails or worm shells.
