= Dendropoma nebulosum =

Scientific classification
- Kingdom: Animalia
- Phylum: Mollusca
- Class: Gastropoda
- Subclass: Caenogastropoda
- Order: Littorinimorpha
- Family: Vermetidae
- Genus: Dendropoma
- Species: D. nebulosum

Binomial name
- Dendropoma nebulosum (Dillwyn, 1817)

Synonyms
- Serpula nebulosa Dillwyn, 1817

Species of gastropod

Dendropoma nebulosum is a species of sea snail, a marine gastropod mollusk in the family Vermetidae, the worm snails or worm shells.
