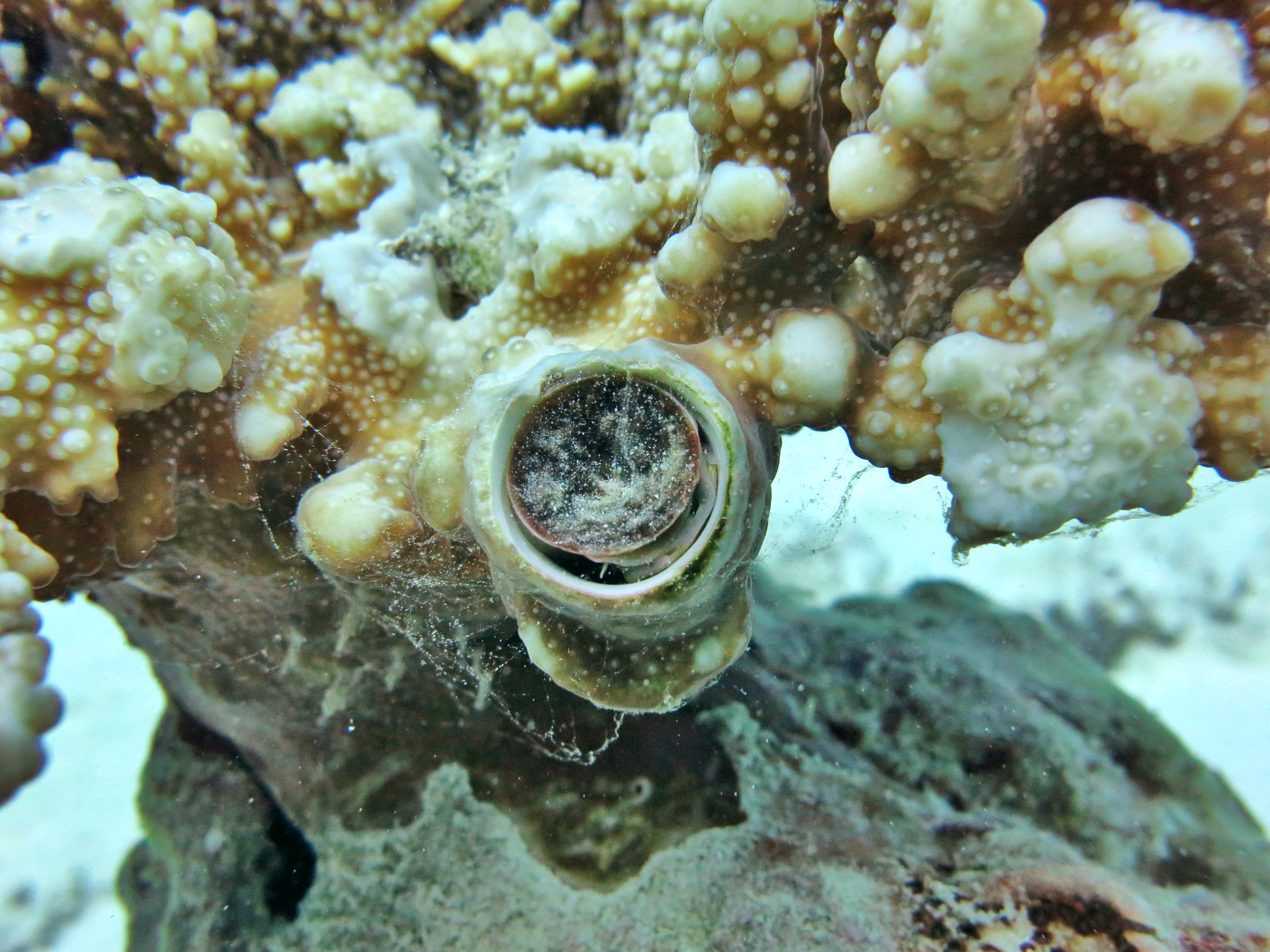
- Ceraesignum maximum

Scientific classification
- Domain: Eukaryota
- Kingdom: Animalia
- Phylum: Mollusca
- Class: Gastropoda
- Subclass: Caenogastropoda
- Order: Littorinimorpha
- Family: Vermetidae
- Genus: Ceraesignum; Golding, Bieler, Rawlings & T.Collins, 2014

= Ceraesignum =

Genus of sea snails

Ceraesignum is a genus of gastropods belonging to the family Vermetidae.

The species of this genus are found in Indian and Pacific Ocean.

Species:

- Ceraesignum maximum (G.B.Sowerby I, 1825)
- Ceraesignum robinsoncrusoei Golding, Bieler, Rawlings & T.Collins, 2014
