= Dendropoma mejillonense =

Scientific classification
- Kingdom: Animalia
- Phylum: Mollusca
- Class: Gastropoda
- Subclass: Caenogastropoda
- Order: Littorinimorpha
- Family: Vermetidae
- Genus: Dendropoma
- Species: D. mejillonense

Binomial name
- Dendropoma mejillonense Pacheco & Laudien, 2008

Species of gastropod

Dendropoma mejillonense is a species of sea snail, a marine gastropod mollusc in the family Vermetidae, the worm snails or worm shells.
