= Thylacodes decussatus =

Scientific classification
- Kingdom: Animalia
- Phylum: Mollusca
- Class: Gastropoda
- Subclass: Caenogastropoda
- Order: Littorinimorpha
- Family: Vermetidae
- Genus: Thylacodes
- Species: T. decussatus

Binomial name
- Thylacodes decussatus (Gmelin, 1791)

Synonyms
- Serpula decussata Gmelin, 1791

Species of gastropod

Thylacodes decussatus is a species of sea snail, a marine gastropod mollusk in the family Vermetidae, commonly known as worm snails or worm shells. This species was formerly known as Serpulorbis decussatus.

== Description ==
The maximum recorded shell length is 90 mm.

== Habitat ==
The minimum recorded depth for this species is 0 m, while the maximum recorded depth is 80 m.
