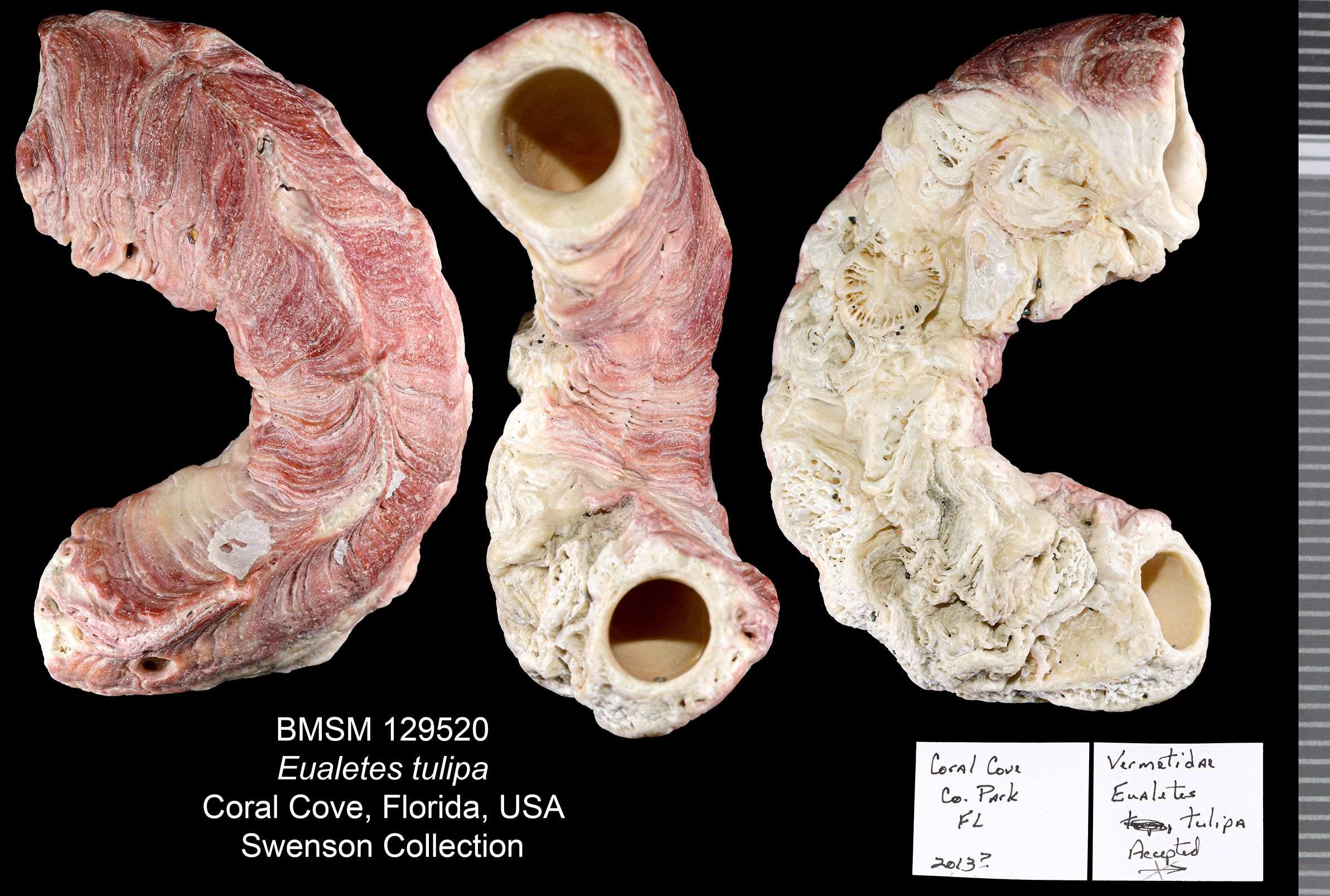
- Eualetes tulipa (Rousseau, 1843) - Coral Cove Park, Palm Beach Co., Florida, USA

Scientific classification
- Kingdom: Animalia
- Phylum: Mollusca
- Class: Gastropoda
- Subclass: Caenogastropoda
- Order: Littorinimorpha
- Family: Vermetidae
- Genus: Eualetes
- Species: E. tulipa

Binomial name
- Eualetes tulipa (Chenu, 1843)

Synonyms
- Eualetes tulipa (Chenu, 1843) (incorrect authorship); Serpulorbis angulatus (Chenu, 1844) (incorrect authorship); Serpulorbis effusus (Chenu, 1844) (incorrect authorship); Serpulorbis panamensis (Chenu, 1844) (incorrect authorship); Thylacodes angulatus Rousseau in Chenu, 1844; Thylacodes effusus Valenciennes in Chenu, 1844; Vermetus alii Hadfield & Kay in Hadfield et al., 1972; Vermetus angulatus Rousseau in Chenu, 1844 (subjective synonym); Vermetus effusus Valenciennes in Chenu, 1844 (subjective synonym); Vermetus panamensis Rousseau in Chenu, 1844 (subjective synonym); Vermetus tulipa Rousseau in Chenu, 1843 (original combination)

= Eualetes tulipa =

Species of gastropod

Eualetes tulipa is a species of sea snail, a marine gastropod mollusk in the family Vermetidae, the worm snails or worm shells.

== Description ==
E. tulipa is a marine gastropod species of the family Vermetidae, commonly known as "worm snails" due to the tube shape of their shells. Vermetids are sessile and are either attached or buried on hard substrates. Once the juvenile attaches to the substrate, the adult shell grows by coiling itself at a right angle to the nuclear whorls of the juvenile shell. This produces a large morphological plasticity in the adults

== Distribution ==
There are reports of this species at several localities in Panama Bay, including the boulder reef at Vera Cruz, Veraguas Province, both in the east Pacific Ocean.

In Hawaii, E. tulipa has been reported as a non-indigenous, introduced species in 32 localities, including Kane‘ohe Bay, Hilo Harbour, O’ahu Waikiki and O’ahu Honolulu, since at least 1997. In these Hawaiian localities, individuals are mainly found attached to artificial substrates such as concrete pilings and walls, metal and wood substrates but also in natural environments such as reefs and mangrove roots.

In the Venezuelan Caribbean, this species (reported as Vermetus sp.) has been observed since at least 1986 in the central west coast near Puerto Cabello colonizing the walls of the intake-cooling sea water channel of a thermoelectric power plant. This species has also been observed at other two localities within the area colonizing other artificial substrates: the first is on the concrete pilings at the deck of El Palito oil refinery, and the other is on the metal remains of a ship wreck.
