= Dendropoma squamiferum =

Scientific classification
- Kingdom: Animalia
- Phylum: Mollusca
- Class: Gastropoda
- Subclass: Caenogastropoda
- Order: Littorinimorpha
- Family: Vermetidae
- Genus: Dendropoma
- Species: D. squamiferum

Binomial name
- Dendropoma squamiferum Ponder, 1967

Species of gastropod

Dendropoma squamiferum is a species of irregularly coiled sea snails, marine gastropod molluscs in the family Vermetidae, the worm snails.
