= Vermetus eruca =

Scientific classification
- Kingdom: Animalia
- Phylum: Mollusca
- Class: Gastropoda
- Subclass: Caenogastropoda
- Order: Littorinimorpha
- Family: Vermetidae
- Genus: Vermetus
- Species: V. eruca

Binomial name
- Vermetus eruca (Lamarck, 1818)

Synonyms
- Vermilia eruca Lamarck, 1818

Species of gastropod

Vermetus eruca is a species of sea snail, a marine gastropod mollusk in the family Vermetidae, the worm snails or worm shells.
