= Dendropoma tholia =

Scientific classification
- Kingdom: Animalia
- Phylum: Mollusca
- Class: Gastropoda
- Subclass: Caenogastropoda
- Order: Littorinimorpha
- Family: Vermetidae
- Genus: Dendropoma
- Species: D. tholia

Binomial name
- Dendropoma tholia Keen & Morton, 1960

Species of gastropod

Dendropoma tholia is a species of sea snail, a marine gastropod mollusk in the family Vermetidae, the worm snails or worm shells.
