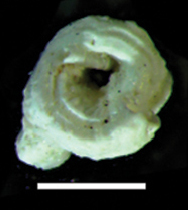

Scientific classification
- Kingdom: Animalia
- Phylum: Mollusca
- Class: Gastropoda
- Subclass: Caenogastropoda
- Order: Littorinimorpha
- Family: Vermetidae
- Genus: Dendropoma
- Species: D. corrodens

Binomial name
- Dendropoma corrodens (d’Orbigny, 1841)

= Dendropoma corrodens =

Species of gastropod

Dendropoma corrodens is a species of small sea snail, a marine gastropod mollusk in the family Vermetidae, the worm snails or worm shells.

== Distribution ==
Found in the Gulf of Mexico and the Caribbean Sea.

== Description ==
The shell of this cemented species is usually not straight but coiled in one loose and irregular coil, however, the maximum recorded shell length is 10 mm.

== Habitat ==
The minimum recorded depth is 0 m; maximum recorded depth is 0 m.
