= Vermetus afer =

Scientific classification
- Kingdom: Animalia
- Phylum: Mollusca
- Class: Gastropoda
- Subclass: Caenogastropoda
- Order: Littorinimorpha
- Family: Vermetidae
- Genus: Vermetus
- Species: V. afer

Binomial name
- Vermetus afer (Gmelin, 1791)

Synonyms
- Serpula afra Gmelin, 1791

Species of gastropod

Vermetus afer is a species of sea snail, a marine gastropod mollusk in the family Vermetidae, the worm snails or worm shells.
