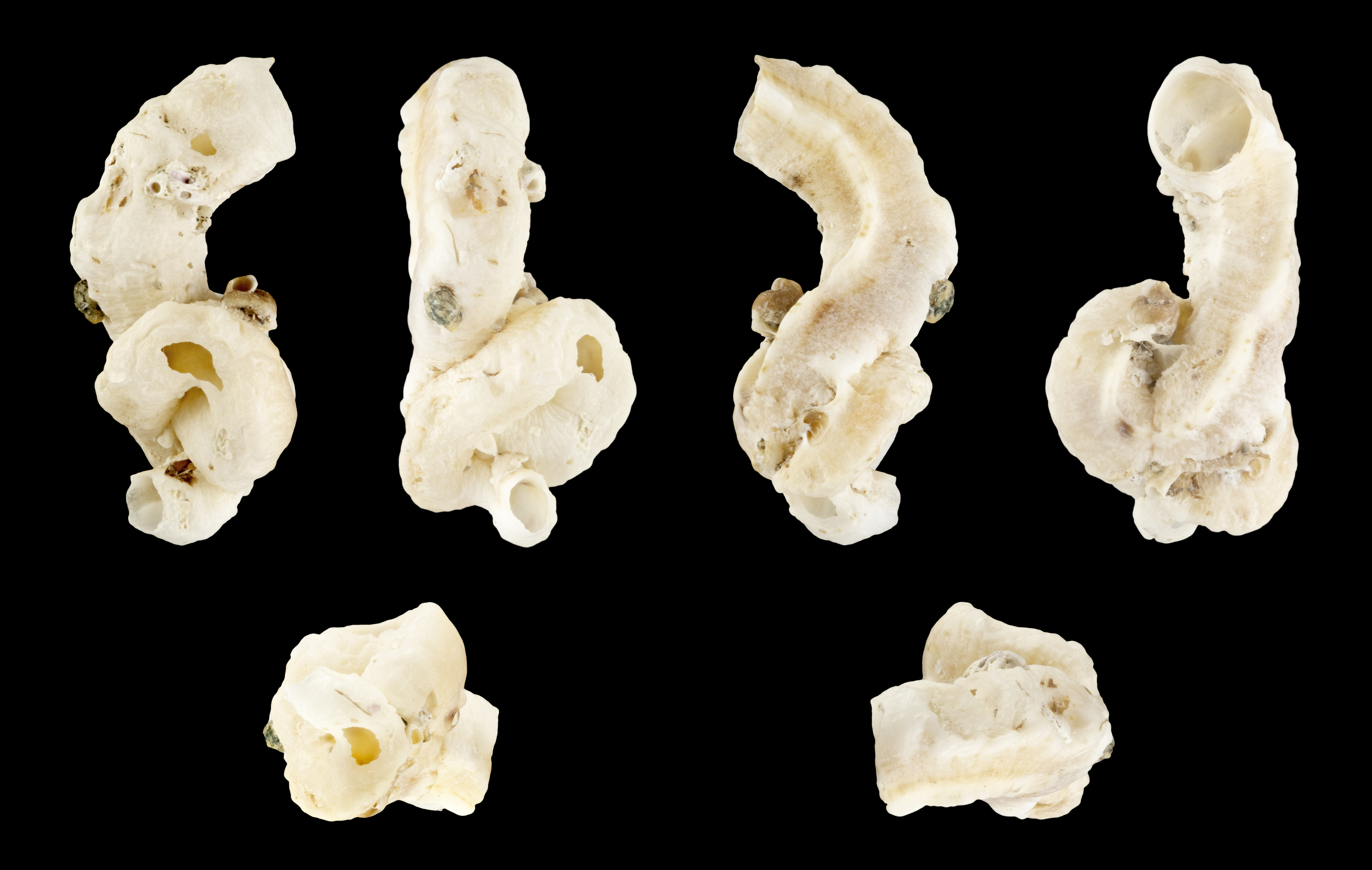

Scientific classification
- Kingdom: Animalia
- Phylum: Mollusca
- Class: Gastropoda
- Subclass: Caenogastropoda
- Order: Littorinimorpha
- Family: Vermetidae
- Genus: Vermetus
- Species: V. triquetrus

Binomial name
- Vermetus triquetrus Bivona-Bernardi, 1832

= Vermetus triquetrus =

Species of gastropod

Vermetus triquetrus is a species of sea snail, a marine gastropod mollusk in the family Vermetidae, the worm snails or worm shells.

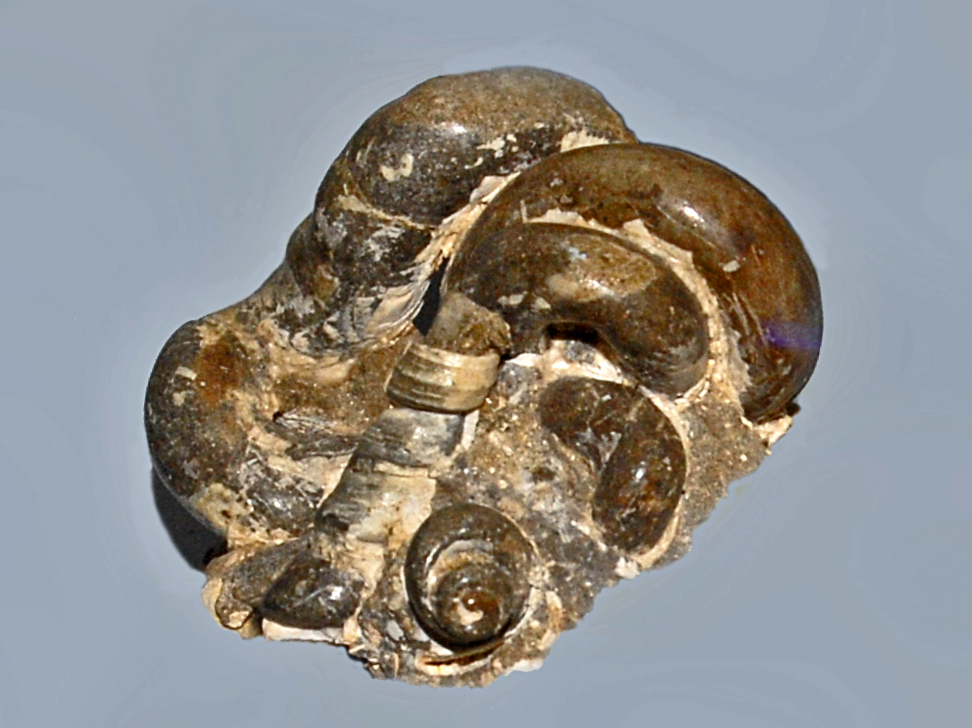
Vermetus triquetrus from the Pliocene of Italy

The genus Vermetus is very ancient. It is known in the fossil records from the Jurassic to the Quaternary (age range: from 164.7 to 0.0 million years ago).

== Description ==
These sea snails are characterized by an unusual appearance and lifecycle. The very young snails do not differ from other snails, as they have a conical, spiral shell. Later they fasten to a hard substrate using calcareous secretions, and the shell starts to take the form of an irregular tube. The length of the adult shell is about 30–50 millimetres (1.2–2.0 in) and the cross section of the shell can reach up to 6 mm in diameter. The small operculum is concave. This is a sessile gastropod the shell of which is cemented to the substrate.

== Distribution and habitat ==
Vermetus triquetrus is widespread in the Mediterranean Sea and in the North Atlantic Ocean. This species inhabits the coastal waters.

== Bibliography ==
- Keen A.M., A proposed reclassification of the gastropod family Vermetidae in Bulletin of the British Museum (Natural History), vol. 7, nº 3, 1961, pp. 181–213
