= Dendropoma anguliferum =

Scientific classification
- Kingdom: Animalia
- Phylum: Mollusca
- Class: Gastropoda
- Subclass: Caenogastropoda
- Order: Littorinimorpha
- Family: Vermetidae
- Genus: Dendropoma
- Species: D. anguliferum

Binomial name
- Dendropoma anguliferum (Monterosato, 1884)

Species of gastropod

Dendropoma anguliferum is a species of sea snail, a marine gastropod mollusk in the family Vermetidae, the worm snails or worm shells.

== Distribution ==
This snail is found in the Mediterranean Sea.
