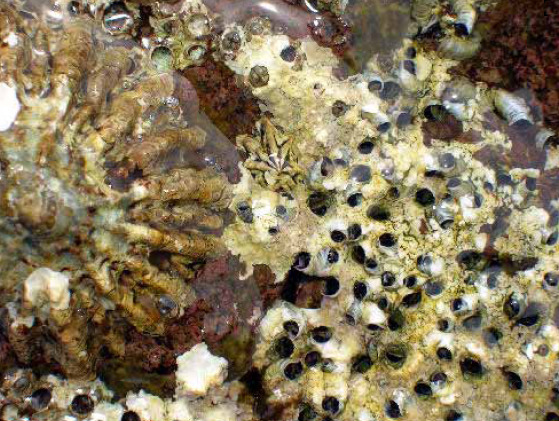
- Dendropoma cristatum

Scientific classification
- Kingdom: Animalia
- Phylum: Mollusca
- Class: Gastropoda
- Subclass: Caenogastropoda
- Order: Littorinimorpha
- Family: Vermetidae
- Genus: Dendropoma
- Species: D. cristatum

Binomial name
- Dendropoma cristatum (Biondi-Giunti, 1859)

Synonyms
- Bivonia petraea Monterosato, 1884; Dendropoma petraeum (Monterosato, 1884); Vermetus cristatus Biondi-Giunti, 1859; Vermetus cristatus f. minor Monterosato, 1892; Vermetus glomeratus Bivona e Bernardi, 1832; Vermetus panormitanus De Gregorio, 1884

= Dendropoma cristatum =

Species of gastropod

Dendropoma cristatum is a species of sea snail, a marine gastropod mollusk in the family Vermetidae, the worm snails or worm shells.
