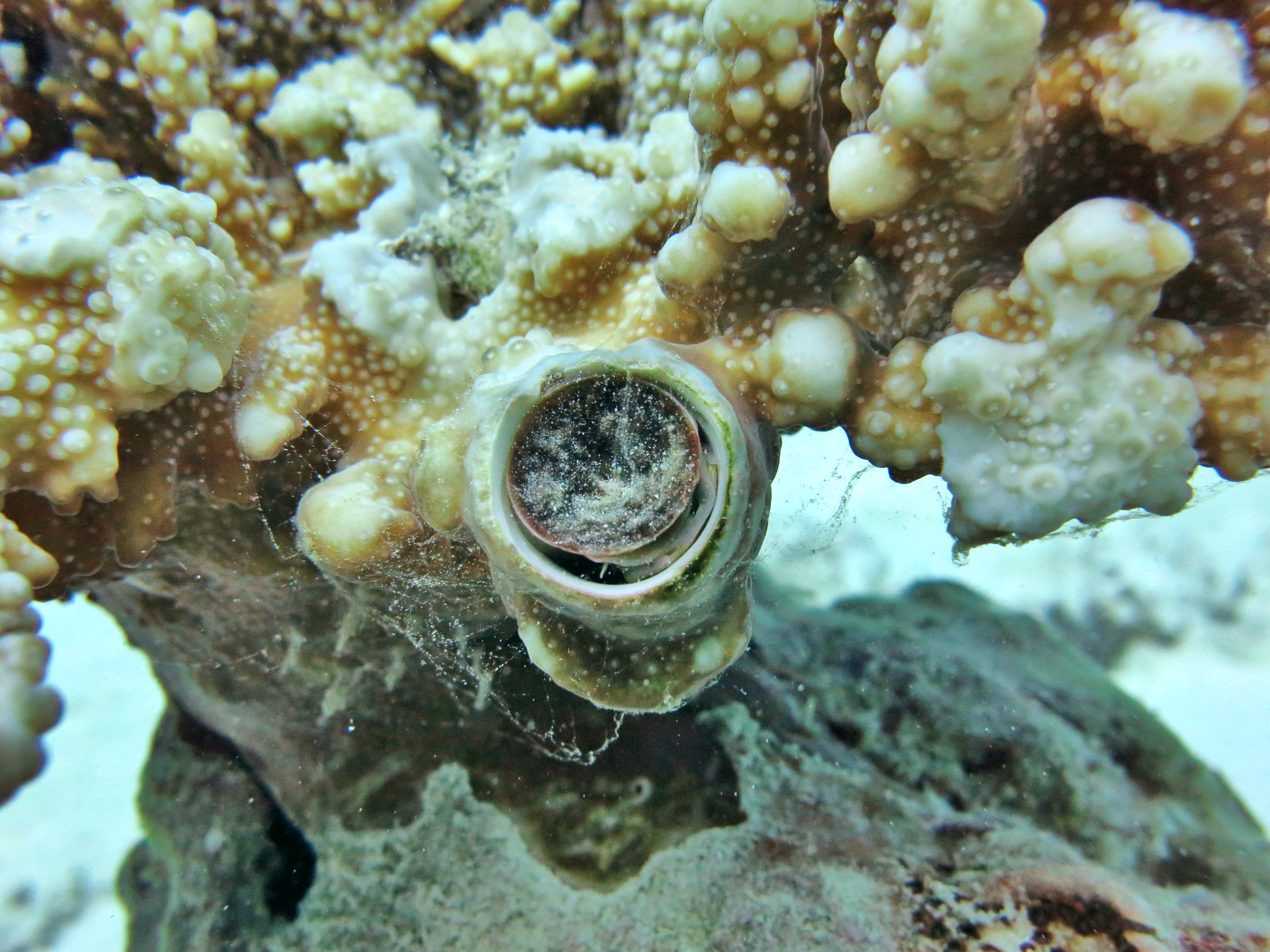

Scientific classification
- Kingdom: Animalia
- Phylum: Mollusca
- Class: Gastropoda
- Subclass: Caenogastropoda
- Order: Littorinimorpha
- Family: Vermetidae
- Genus: Ceraesignum
- Species: C. maximum

Binomial name
- Ceraesignum maximum (Sowerby I, 1825)

= Ceraesignum maximum =

Species of gastropod

Ceraesignum maximum is a species of gastropods belonging to the family Vermetidae.

The species is found in Indian and Pacific Ocean. It lives on coral reefs and is edible. Distinct genetic populations exist due to oceanic isolation.
