= Thylacodes aotearoicus =

Scientific classification
- Kingdom: Animalia
- Phylum: Mollusca
- Class: Gastropoda
- Subclass: Caenogastropoda
- Order: Littorinimorpha
- Family: Vermetidae
- Genus: Thylacodes
- Species: T. aotearoicus

Binomial name
- Thylacodes aotearoicus Morton, 1951

Species of gastropod

Thylacodes aotearoicus is a species of sea snail, a worm snail or worm shell, a marine gastropod mollusc in the family Vermetidae, the worm snails. This species was previously known as Serpulorbis aotearoicus.

== Bibliography ==
- Powell A. W. B., New Zealand Mollusca, William Collins Publishers Ltd, Auckland, New Zealand 1979 ISBN 0-00-216906-1
