= Vermetidae incertae sedis goreensis =

Scientific classification
- Kingdom: Animalia
- Phylum: Mollusca
- Class: Gastropoda
- Subclass: Caenogastropoda
- Order: Littorinimorpha
- Family: Vermetidae
- Genus: incertae sedis
- Species: goreensis

Binomial name
- Vermetidae incertae sedis goreensis (Gmelin, 1791)

Species of gastropod

Vermetidae incertae sedis goreensis is a species of sea snail, a marine gastropod mollusk in the family Vermetidae, the worm snails or worm shells.

This is a nomen dubium.
