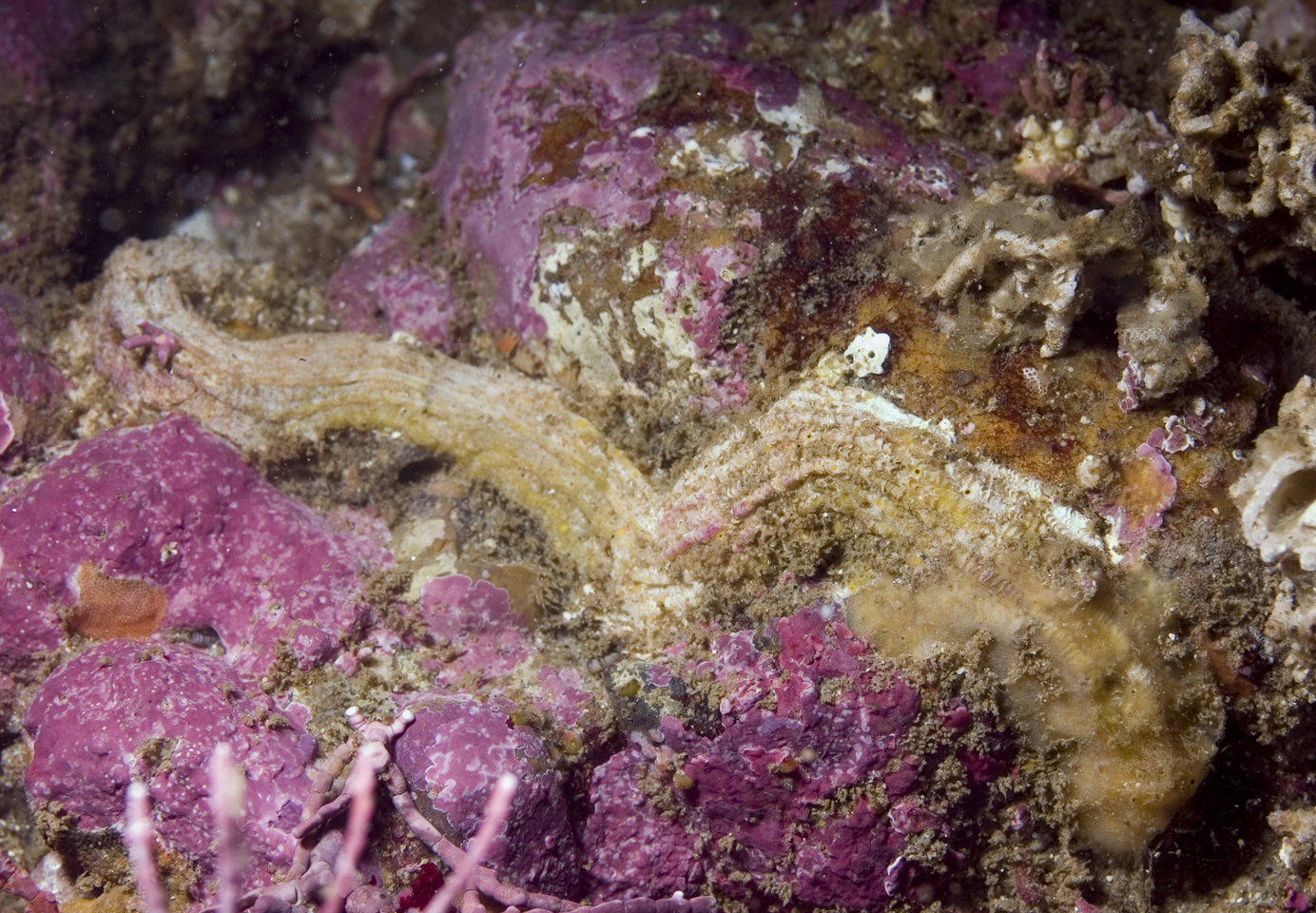
- A view of the shell of a single live Thylacodes squamigerus

Scientific classification
- Kingdom: Animalia
- Phylum: Mollusca
- Class: Gastropoda
- Subclass: Caenogastropoda
- Order: Littorinimorpha
- Superfamily: Vermetoidea
- Family: Vermetidae
- Genus: Thylacodes; Guettard, 1770

Type species
- Serpulorbis polyphragma Sasso, 1827

Synonyms
- Aletes P. P. Carpenter, 1857; Cladopoda Gray, 1850 (subjective synonym); Serpulorbis Sasso, 1827 (objective synonym); Serpulus (Tetranemia) Mörch, 1859; Siphonium (Aletes) P. P. Carpenter, 1857 · unaccepted; Tetranemia Mörch, 1859; Tulaxoda Blainville, 1828 (objective synonym); Tulaxodus Guettard, 1770

= Thylacodes =

Genus of gastropods

Thylacodes is a genus of sea snails, marine gastropod mollusks in the family Vermetidae, the worm snails or worm shells. The species in this genus were previously placed in the genus Serpulorbis.

Unlike some other vermetids, the species in this genus have no operculum.

Like other vermetids, the species in this genus do not have regular shell coiling like that of a typical gastropod shell, instead they have shells which are irregular. They are usually cemented onto a hard surface. Because of all this, the shells resemble the calcareous tubes of worms in the polychaete family Serpulidae.

== Species ==
Species within the genus Thylacodes include:

- Thylacodes adamsii (Mörch, 1859)
- Thylacodes aotearoicus (J. E. Morton, 1951)
- Thylacodes arenarius (Linnaeus, 1758)
- Thylacodes aureus (Hughes, 1978)
- Thylacodes borshenglyuhrurngae K.-Y. Lai, 2018
- Thylacodes capensis (Thiele, 1925)
- Thylacodes colubrinus (Röding, 1798)
- Thylacodes constrictor (Mörch, 1862)
- Thylacodes daidai (Scheuwimmer & Nishiwaki, 1982)
- Thylacodes decussatus (Gmelin, 1791)
- Thylacodes dentiferus (Lamarck, 1818)
- Thylacodes eruciformis (Mörch, 1862)
- Thylacodes grandis (Gray, 1842)
- Thylacodes hadfieldi (Kelly, 2007)
- Thylacodes inopertus (Leuckart in Rüppell & Leuckart, 1828)
- Thylacodes lamarckii (Vaillant, 1871)
- Thylacodes longifilis (Mörch, 1862)
- Thylacodes lornensis (Marwick, 1926) †
- Thylacodes margaritaceus (Rousseau in Chenu, 1844)
- Thylacodes masier (Deshayes, 1843)
- Thylacodes medusae (Pilsbry, 1891)
- Thylacodes megalostomus (Mörch, 1865)
- Thylacodes natalensis (Mörch, 1862)
- Thylacodes nodosorugosus (Lischke, 1869)
- Thylacodes novaehollandiae (Rousseau in Chenu, 1843)
- Thylacodes ophioides (P. Marshall & R. Murdoch, 1921) †
- Thylacodes oryzatus (Mörch, 1862)
- Thylacodes peronii (Rousseau in Chenu, 1844)
- Thylacodes riisei (Mörch, 1862)
- Thylacodes roussaei (Vaillant, 1871)
- Thylacodes sipho (Lamarck, 1818)
- Thylacodes squamigerus (Carpenter, 1857)
- Thylacodes squamolineatus (Petuch, 2002)
- Thylacodes sutilis (Mörch, 1862)
- Thylacodes trimeresurus (Shikama & Horikoshi, 1963)
- Thylacodes vandyensis (Bieler et al., 2017)
- Thylacodes variabilis (Hadfield & Kay, 1972)
- Thylacodes varidus (Okutani & Habe, 1975)
- Thylacodes xenophorus (Habe, 1961)
- Thylacodes yokojima (Shikama, 1977)
- Thylacodes zelandicus (Quoy & Gaimard, 1834)

Synonyms

- Thylacodes angulatus (Rousseau in Chenu, 1844) = Eualetes tulipa (Rousseau in Chenu, 1843)
- Thylacodes caperatus (Tate & May, 1900) = Petaloconchus caperatus (Tate & May, 1900)
- Thylacodes dentiferus (Mörch, 1859) = Thylacodes longifilis (Mörch, 1862)
- Thylacodes effusus (Valenciennes in Chenu, 1844) = Eualetes tulipa (Rousseau in Chenu, 1843)
- Thylacodes oryzata (Mörch, 1862) = Thylacodes oryzatus (Mörch, 1862)
