= Dendropoma gregarium =

Scientific classification
- Domain: Eukaryota
- Kingdom: Animalia
- Phylum: Mollusca
- Class: Gastropoda
- Subclass: Caenogastropoda
- Order: Littorinimorpha
- Family: Vermetidae
- Genus: Dendropoma
- Species: D. gregarium

Binomial name
- Dendropoma gregarium M. G. Hadfield & Kay, 1972

Synonyms
- Dendropoma gregaria [sic] (incorrect gender ending)

Species of snail

Dendropoma gregarium is a worm snail common in intertidal and subtidal areas in Hawaiʻi and the tropical Pacific.

== Description ==
The Dendropoma gregarium is a worm snail in the family Vermetidae. It is identifiable by its brown shell that forms in irregular coils around its body, making it resemble a worm.

== Distribution ==
D. gregarium is found in Hawaii and the Tropical Eastern Pacific. In Hawaiian it is known as kio pōhakupele or kio po'apo'ai.

== Habitat ==
D. gregarium inhabit the intertidal and subtidal zone. All worm snails are sessile, they attach to rocks or hard surfaces where they will remain for their entire lives. While on these rocks they often look like small black holes.
