= Cerithiovermetus =

Scientific classification
- Kingdom: Animalia
- Phylum: Mollusca
- Class: Gastropoda
- Subclass: Caenogastropoda
- Order: Littorinimorpha
- Family: Vermetidae
- Genus: Cerithiovermetus; Bandel, 2006

Genus of gastropods

Cerithiovermetus is a genus of sea snails, marine gastropod mollusks in the family Vermetidae, the worm snails or worm shells.

== Species ==
Species within the genus Cerithiovermetus include:

- Cerithiovermetus aqabensis Bandel, 2006
- Cerithiovermetus vinxi Bandel, 2006
