= Thylacodes masier =

Scientific classification
- Kingdom: Animalia
- Phylum: Mollusca
- Class: Gastropoda
- Subclass: Caenogastropoda
- Order: Littorinimorpha
- Family: Vermetidae
- Genus: Thylacodes
- Species: T. masier

Binomial name
- Thylacodes masier Deshayes, 1843

Synonyms
- Vermetus masier Deshayes, 1843 (original combination)

Species of gastropod

Thylacodes masier is a species of sea snail, a marine gastropod mollusk in the family Vermetidae, the worm snails or worm shells.
