= Thylacodes zelandicus =

Scientific classification
- Kingdom: Animalia
- Phylum: Mollusca
- Class: Gastropoda
- Subclass: Caenogastropoda
- Order: Littorinimorpha
- Family: Vermetidae
- Genus: Thylacodes
- Species: T. zelandicus

Binomial name
- Thylacodes zelandicus (Quoy and Gaimard, 1834)

Synonyms
- Vermetus zelandicus Quoy and Gaimard, 1834; Serpulorbis sipho Suter, 1913

Species of gastropod

Thylacodes zelandicus is a species of sea snail, a worm snail or worm shell, a marine gastropod mollusc in the family Vermetidae, the worm snails. This species was previously known as Serpulorbis zelandicus.
