= Novastoa =

Scientific classification
- Domain: Eukaryota
- Kingdom: Animalia
- Phylum: Mollusca
- Class: Gastropoda
- Subclass: Caenogastropoda
- Order: Littorinimorpha
- Family: Vermetidae
- Genus: Novastoa; Finlay, 1927

Species
- See text

Genus of gastropods

Novastoa is a genus of sea snails, marine gastropod molluscs in the family Vermetidae, the worm snails.

== Species ==
Species within the genus Novastoa include:

- Novastoa lamellosa (Hutton, 1873)
