= Thylacodes variabilis =

Scientific classification
- Kingdom: Animalia
- Phylum: Mollusca
- Class: Gastropoda
- Subclass: Caenogastropoda
- Order: Littorinimorpha
- Family: Vermetidae
- Genus: Thylacodes
- Species: T. variabilis

Binomial name
- Thylacodes variabilis (Hadfield & Kay, 1972)

Synonyms
- Serpulorbis variabilis M. G. Hadfield & Kay, 1972 superseded combination

Species of mollusc

Thylacodes variabilis is a species of worm snail common in the rocky intertidal in Hawaiʻi and the tropical Pacific.

== Description ==
Thylacodes variabilis has a white-brown shell, which is coiled or partly straight and can reach a diameter of 14 millimeters. The shell is often overgrown with coralline algae or coated with sand grains. This is the only worm snail in Hawaii that has no operculum. Their body color is polychromatic, individuals vary in coloration from white to beige, brown, yellow and orange. Like other members of its family, Thylacodes variabilis filter algae and detritus out of the water column as their source of nutrients.

== Reproduction ==
Females of Thylacodes variabilis brood their offspring in egg capsules that are attached to the inside of their shells.

== Habitat ==
Thylacodes variabilis resides down to depths of 40 feet. The snail lives in open environments, to include: tide pools, shallow, wave-swept reef flats, and rocky reefs. They attach their shell to natural and artificial surfaces. They can also be transported on vessel hulls and other drifting substrates.
