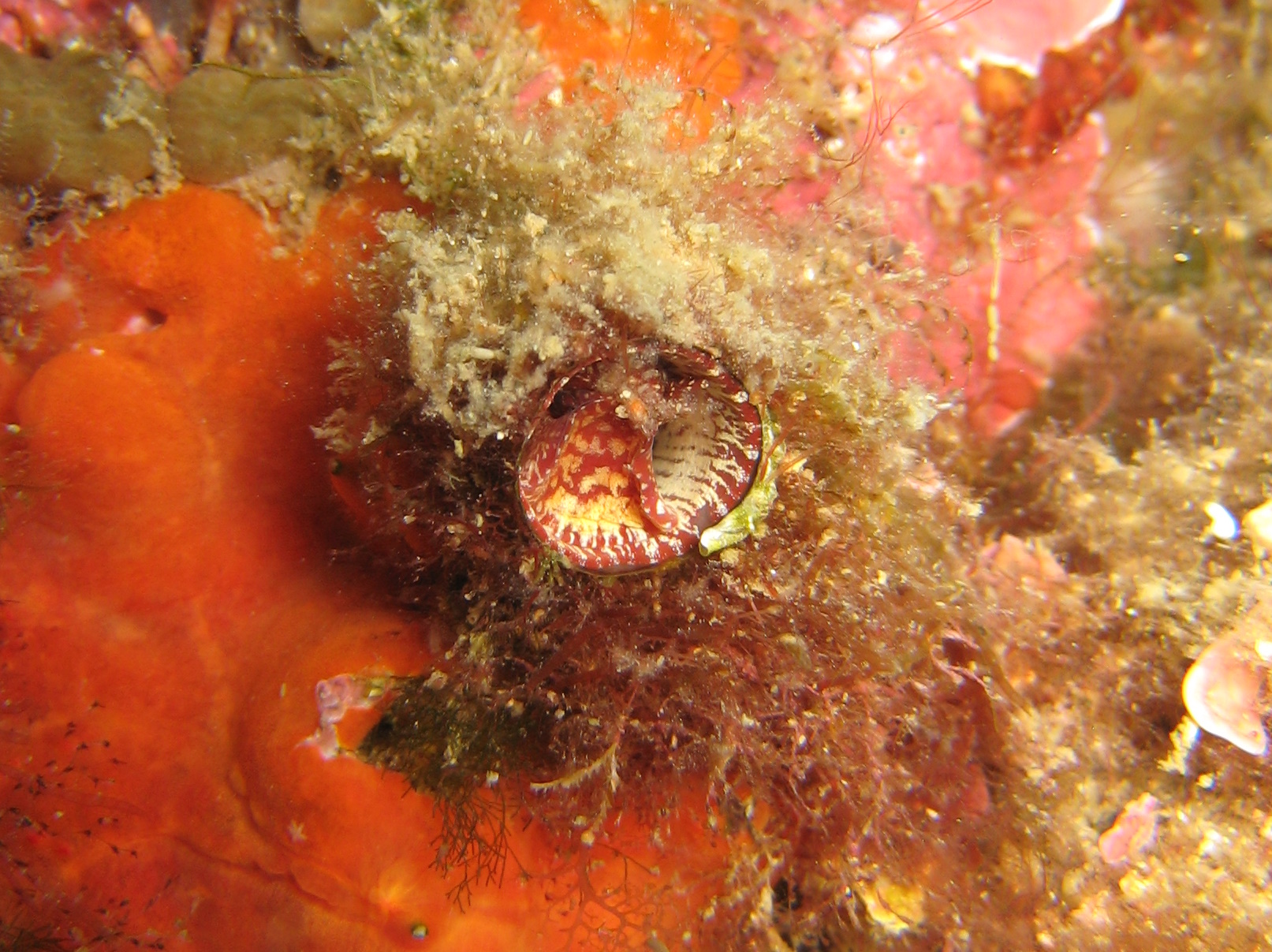
- A live individual of Thylacodes arenarius
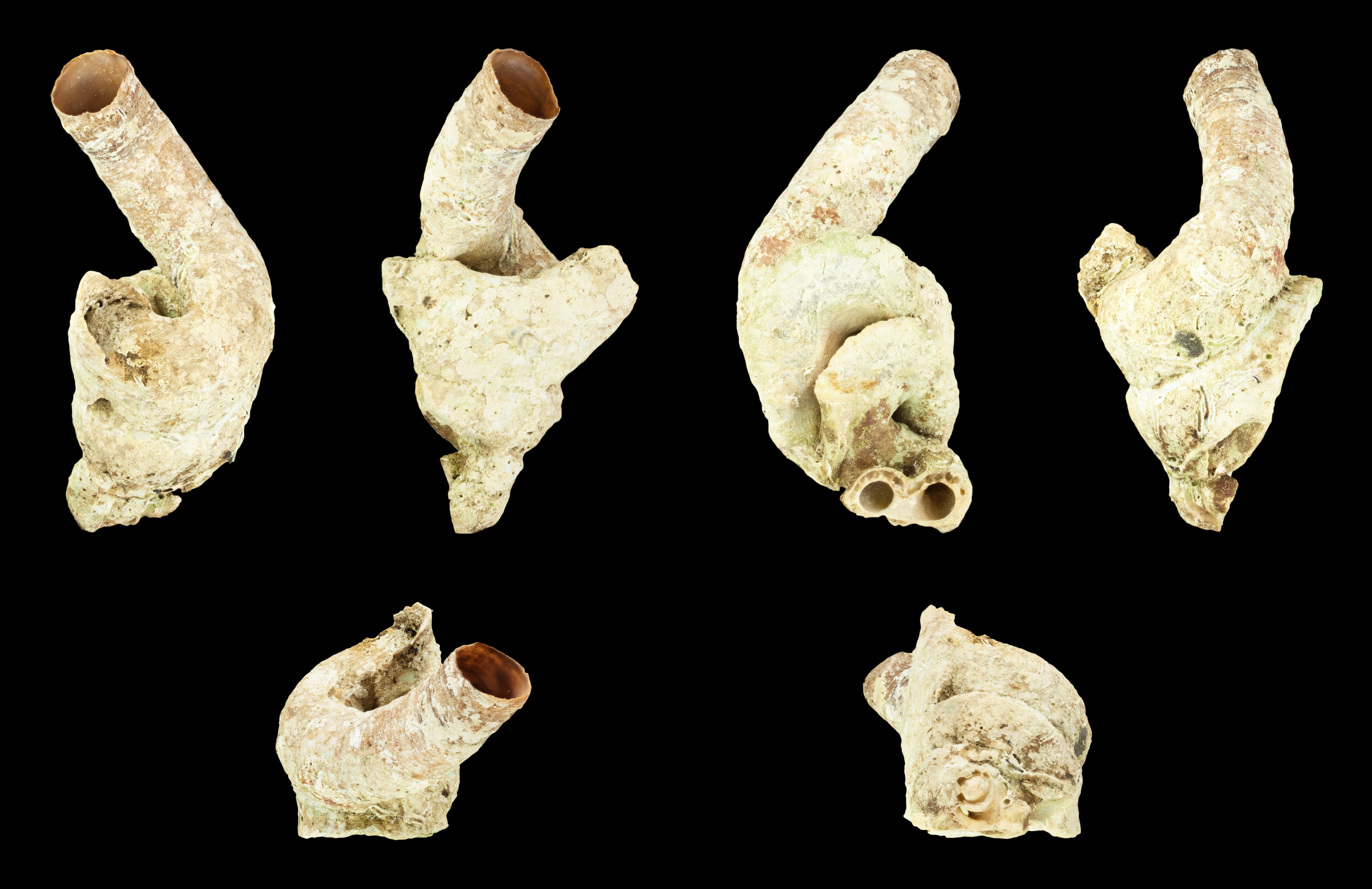
- A shell of Thylacodes arenarius

Scientific classification
- Kingdom: Animalia
- Phylum: Mollusca
- Class: Gastropoda
- Subclass: Caenogastropoda
- Order: Littorinimorpha
- Family: Vermetidae
- Genus: Thylacodes
- Species: T. arenarius

Binomial name
- Thylacodes arenarius (Linnaeus, 1758)

Synonyms
- See list

= Thylacodes arenarius =

Species of gastropod

Thylacodes arenarius is a species of sea snail, a marine gastropod mollusk in the family Vermetidae, the worm snails or worm shells.

== Description ==
Shells of T. arenarius are irregular, and can reach a length of about 100–200 millimetres (3.9–7.9 in). The diameter of the round opening reach 11–15 millimetres (0.43–0.59 in). The inner surface is smooth and shiny. These shells are cemented onto a hard surface and resemble the calcareous tubes of certain marine worms, for example worms in the polychaete family Serpulidae. The visible part of the body is red with cream markings. The foot of this mollusk is atrophied and it has lost its function of movement.

== Distribution ==
This species can be found in the Mediterranean Sea - Eastern Basin and in the North Atlantic Ocean - European waters.

== Synonyms ==
- Lemintina arenaria (Linnaeus, 1758)
- Lemintina selecta (Monterosato, 1878)
- Lemintina selecta var. arborea Monterosato, 1884
- Serpula arenaria Linnaeus, 1758 (original combination. Not Polychaeta, transferred to Vermetidae Mollusca)
- Serpulorbis arenarius (Linnaeus, 1758)
- Serpulorbis polyphragma Sasso, 1827
- Serpulus arenarius var. gracilior Mörch, 1859 (infrasubspecific)
- Thylacodus polyphragma (Sasso, 1827)
- Thylacodus polyphragma var. aletes Mörch, 1862 (synonym)
- Vermetus arenarius (Linnaeus, 1758)
- Vermetus arenarius var. minor Sacco, 1896 (junior primary homonym)
- Vermetus dentifer Lamarck, 1818 (synonym)
- Vermetus gigas Bivona in Philippi, 1836
- Vermetus gigas f. conglobatus Monterosato, 1892
- Vermetus gigas f. destitutus Monterosato, 1892
- Vermetus gigas var. angulatus Monterosato, 1880 (junior primary homonym)
- Vermetus gigas var. conglobata Monterosato, 1892 (synonym)
- Vermetus gigas var. destituta Monterosato, 1892 (synonym)
- Vermetus gigas var. minor Pallary, 1912 (junior primary homonym, permanently invalid)
- Vermetus gigas var. rufa Monterosato, 1892 (synonym)
- Vermetus gigas var. typica Monterosato, 1892 (synonym)
- Vermetus horridus Monterosato, 1892
- Vermetus horridus f. asperrimus Monterosato, 1892
- Vermetus horridus var. asperrima Monterosato, 1892 (synonym)
- Vermetus horridus var. minor Pallary, 1938 (junior primary homonym)
- Vermetus polyphragma (Sasso, 1827)
- Vermetus polyphragma f. anguinus Monterosato, 1892
- Vermetus polyphragma f. major Monterosato, 1892
- Vermetus polyphragma f. tortuosus Monterosato, 1892
- Vermetus polyphragma var. anguina Monterosato, 1892 (synonym)
- Vermetus polyphragma var. major Monterosato, 1892 (synonym)
- Vermetus polyphragma var. tortuosa Monterosato, 1892 (synonym)
- Vermetus scopulosus Monterosato, 1892
- Vermetus scopulosus f. discoideus Monterosato, 1892 (junior primary homonym)
- Vermetus selectus Monterosato, 1878
- Vermetus selectus f. ramosus Monterosato, 1892
- Vermetus selectus var. arborea Monterosato, 1892 (synonym)
- Vermetus selectus var. ramosa Monterosato, 1892 (synonym)
- Vermetus verrucosus Monterosato, 1892
- Vermicularia lineolata Gravenhorst, 1831 (subjective synonym)
