= Sakarahellidae =

Scientific classification
- Kingdom: Animalia
- Phylum: Mollusca
- Class: Gastropoda
- Subclass: Caenogastropoda
- Order: Littorinimorpha
- Superfamily: Vermetoidea
- Family: †Sakarahellidae

Extinct family of molluscs

Sakarahellidae is an extinct family of gastropods belonging to the order Littorinimorpha.

Genera:

- Sakarahella Bandel, 2006
