= Dendropoma corallinaceum =

Scientific classification
- Kingdom: Animalia
- Phylum: Mollusca
- Class: Gastropoda
- Subclass: Caenogastropoda
- Order: Littorinimorpha
- Family: Vermetidae
- Genus: Dendropoma
- Species: D. corallinaceum

Binomial name
- Dendropoma corallinaceum (Tomlin, 1939)

Synonyms
- Vermetus corallinaceus Tomlin, 1939

Species of sea snail

Dendropoma corallinaceum is a species of sea snail, a marine gastropod mollusk in the family Vermetidae, the worm snails or worm shells. It is a colonial species and forms aggregations on the lower shore near low-water mark. It is native to South Africa.

== Description ==
Dendropoma corallinaceum is a gregarious species which forms clusters of white, irregular tubes up to 3 mm (0.1 in) in diameter and 10 mm (0.4 in) in length, often embedded into the thin layer of coralline algae covering the rocks. The tubes are tangled together and cemented to a hard surface. Each tube has a reddish-brown flat operculum with a raised central bulge.

== Distribution and habitat ==
Dendropoma corallinaceum is native to the western Indian Ocean and the southeastern Atlantic Ocean and occurs round the coasts of South Africa and Mozambique. It is found attached to rocks on shallow reefs and is often encrusted by coralline algae. It may form large sheets near low tide mark on exposed rocky shores.

== Biology ==
Dendropoma corallinaceum breeds between July and December. A single embryo is brooded in a capsule in the mantle cavity of the snail. When sufficiently mature, the protoconch crawls out of the tube and uses a sticky trail of mucus to avoid being swept away. It moves towards light and settles after between one and five days, whenever it finds a suitable position in which to anchor itself. About two days later it undergoes metamorphosis. It prefers to settle on the coralline alga Lithothamnion in which it can easily cut a groove with its radula. This helps it to attach itself firmly to the substrate and avoid being swept away by the waves. This worm snail is a suspension feeder. It secretes a mucus net which ensnares food particles from the surrounding water and is periodically wound up and swallowed by the snail. The nets of nearby snails overlap each other and coalesce. Parts may get hauled in by a snail other than the one that secreting that part.
