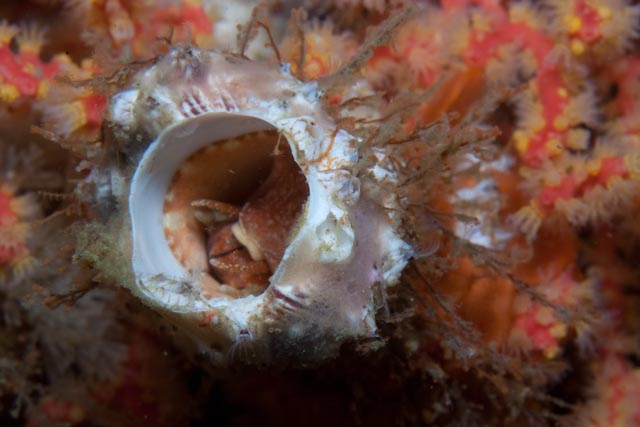

Scientific classification
- Kingdom: Animalia
- Phylum: Mollusca
- Class: Gastropoda
- Subclass: Caenogastropoda
- Order: Littorinimorpha
- Family: Vermetidae
- Genus: Thylacodes
- Species: T. natalensis

Binomial name
- Thylacodes natalensis (Mörch, 1862)

= Thylacodes natalensis =

Species of gastropod

Thylacodes natalensis, common name the solitary worm shell, is a species of sea snail, a marine gastropod mollusk, in the family Vermetidae, the worm snails or worm shells. The species was previously known as Serpulorbis natalensis.
