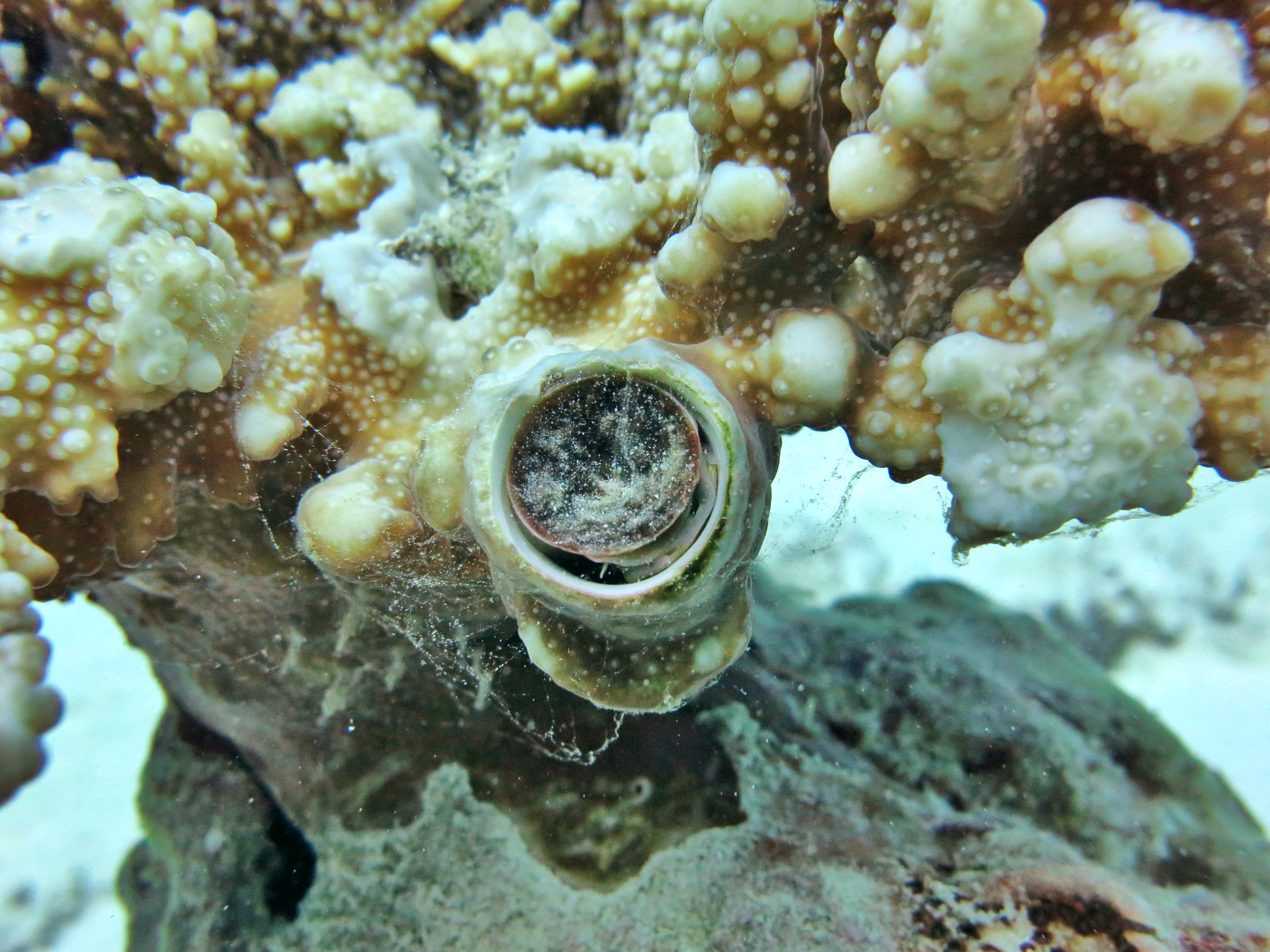
- Dendropoma maxima, Maldives

Scientific classification
- Domain: Eukaryota
- Kingdom: Animalia
- Phylum: Mollusca
- Class: Gastropoda
- Subclass: Caenogastropoda
- Order: Littorinimorpha
- Superfamily: Vermetoidea; Rafinesque, 1815

Families
- See text

= Vermetoidea =

Superfamily of gastropods

The Vermetoidea, the worm snails or worm shells, are a taxonomic superfamily of small to medium-sized sea snails, marine gastropod molluscs in the order Littorinimorpha.

The shells of species in the family Vermetidae are extremely irregular, and do not resemble the average snail shell, hence the common name "worm shells" or "worm snails".

== Families ==
- Sakarahellidae† Bandel, 2006
- Vermetidae Rafinesque, 1815
