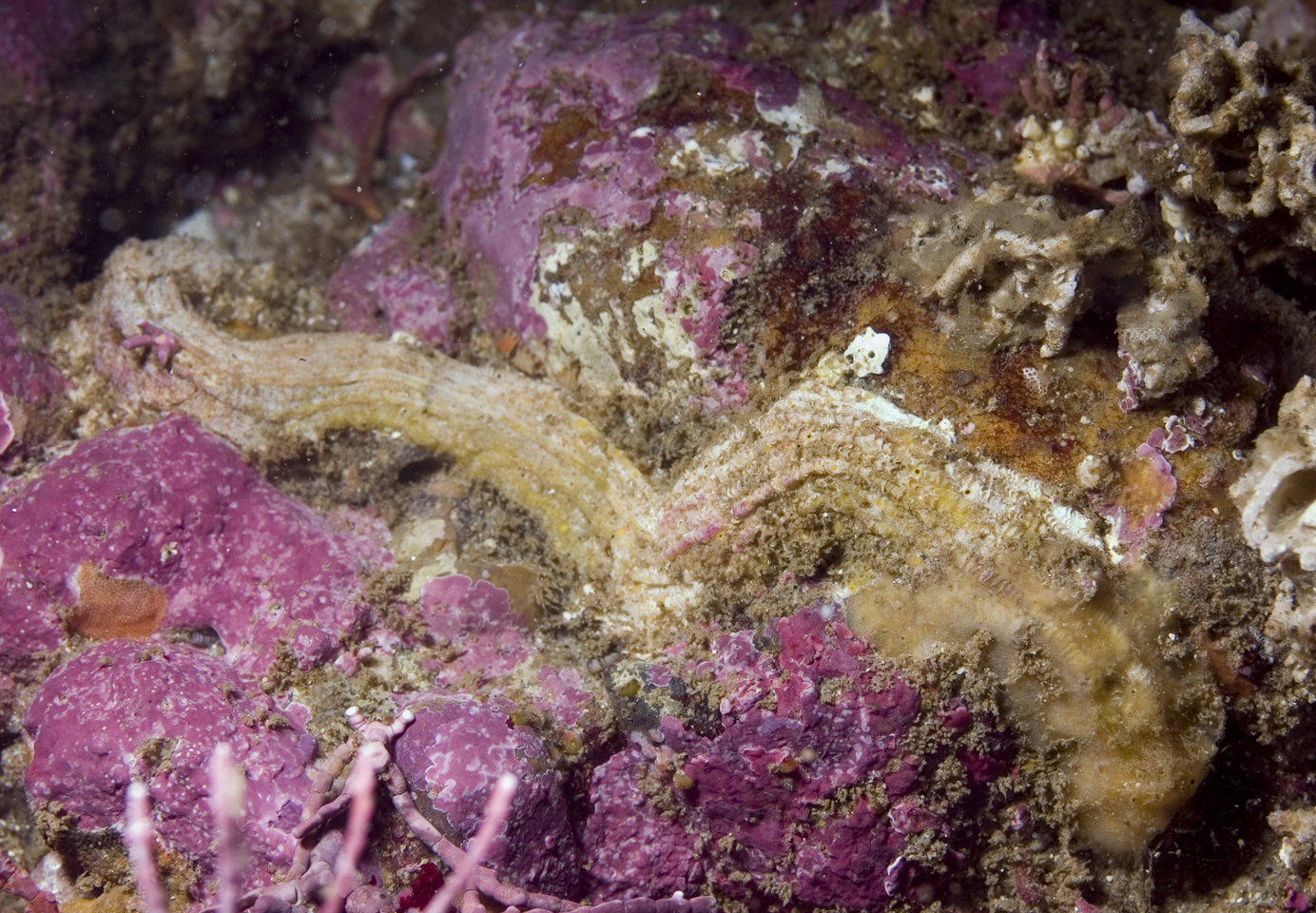
- A view of the shell of a live Thylacodes squamigerus

Scientific classification
- Kingdom: Animalia
- Phylum: Mollusca
- Class: Gastropoda
- Subclass: Caenogastropoda
- Order: Littorinimorpha
- Family: Vermetidae
- Genus: Thylacodes
- Species: T. squamigerus

Binomial name
- Thylacodes squamigerus (Carpenter, 1856)

= Thylacodes squamigerus =

Species of gastropod

Thylacodes squamigerus, commonly known as the scaled worm snail, is a species of sea snail, a marine gastropod mollusk in the family Vermetidae, the worm snails. This species was previously known as Serpulorbis squamigerus.

== Description ==
The shell of the scaled worm snail is often cemented into colonies. It is a uniquely sedentary snail. The shells can grow up to about 5 in (12.7 cm) long and 0.5 in (1.3 cm) wide. The growth of the shell is irregular, as it shapes to the surface it is attached to. The opening of the shell has no operculum and faces upward. The color of the shell is gray or pinkish. Scaly, longitudinal ribs run along the shell, giving the worm snail its common name.

== Distribution and habitat ==
The scaled worm snail lives along the Pacific coast of North America, from California to Baja California. In 2013 to 2015, the marine heatwave given the name the Blob was documented to have allowed for a northern push of the worm snail to regions of California it had previously not been observed in.

Within the scaled worm snail's range, it is found living attached to rock and dock pilings in protected areas. It can live at depths ranging from the intertidal zone to 20 m (65 ft).

== Biology ==
Similar to other worm snails, the scaled worm snail feeds by spinning mucus into a net that attaches to the substrate around it. This net captures detritus in the water, including small pieces of kelp. The worm snail uses its radula to collect the detritus off the trap.
