= Jean-Charles Chenu =

French physician, naturalist and author

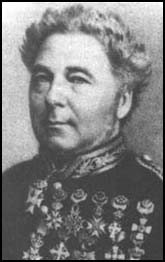
- Born: 30 August 1808; Metz, France
- Died: 12 November 1879 (aged 71); Paris, France

Jean-Charles Chenu (30 August 1808 – 12 November 1879) was a French medical doctor, naturalist and writer.

== Bibliography ==
Natural history

- Illustrations conchyliologiques ou description et figures de toutes les coquilles connues vivantes et fossiles, classées suivant le système de Lamarck modifié d'après les progrès de la science et comprenant les genres nouveaux et les espèces rècemment découvertes (1842–1854)
  - 1842. Tome I. – Volume one contains ammonites, land snails and sea snails.
- 1845. Histoire Naturelle des Coquilles D'Angleterre. Paris, A. Franck. – This is translation in French from English of work by Edward Donovan. The Natural History of British Shells, including Figures and Descriptions of all the Species Hitherto Discovered in Great Britain, Systematically Arranged in the Linnean Manner, with Scientific and General Observations on Each., 5 volumes.
- Jean-Charles Chenu. 1845. Conchologie Americáine ou descriptions et figures des coquilles du nord de l'Amérique Paris, A. Franck, Libraire-Éditeur, rue Richelieu, 69,
- Leçons élémentaires d'histoire naturelle, comprenant un aperçu sur toute la zoologie et un Traité de conchyliologie, (1846)
- Encyclopédie d'histoire naturelle ou Traité complet de cette science d'après les travaux des naturalistes les plus éminents, (1850 – 1861) accompagné des Tables alphabétiques des noms vulgaires et scientifiques de tous les animaux décrits et figurés dans cette encyclopédie, dressées par Desmarests
- Manuel de conchyliologie et de paléontologie conchyliologée, (1859 – 1862)
- Leçons élémentaires sur l'histoire naturelle des oiseaux, (1862 – 1863)

Medical

- Rapport sur le choléra-morbus, (1835)
- Rapport au conseil de santé des armées sur les résultats du service médico-chirurgical aux ambulances de Crimée et aux hôpitaux militaires français de Turquie, pendant la campagne d'Orient en 1854-1856-1856, (1865)
- De la mortalité dans l'armée et des moyens d'économiser la vie humaine, (1870)
- Statistique médico-chirurgicale de la campagne d'Italie en 1859 et 1860, (2 volumes et un atlas, 1869)
- Recrutement de l'armée et population de la France, (1867)
