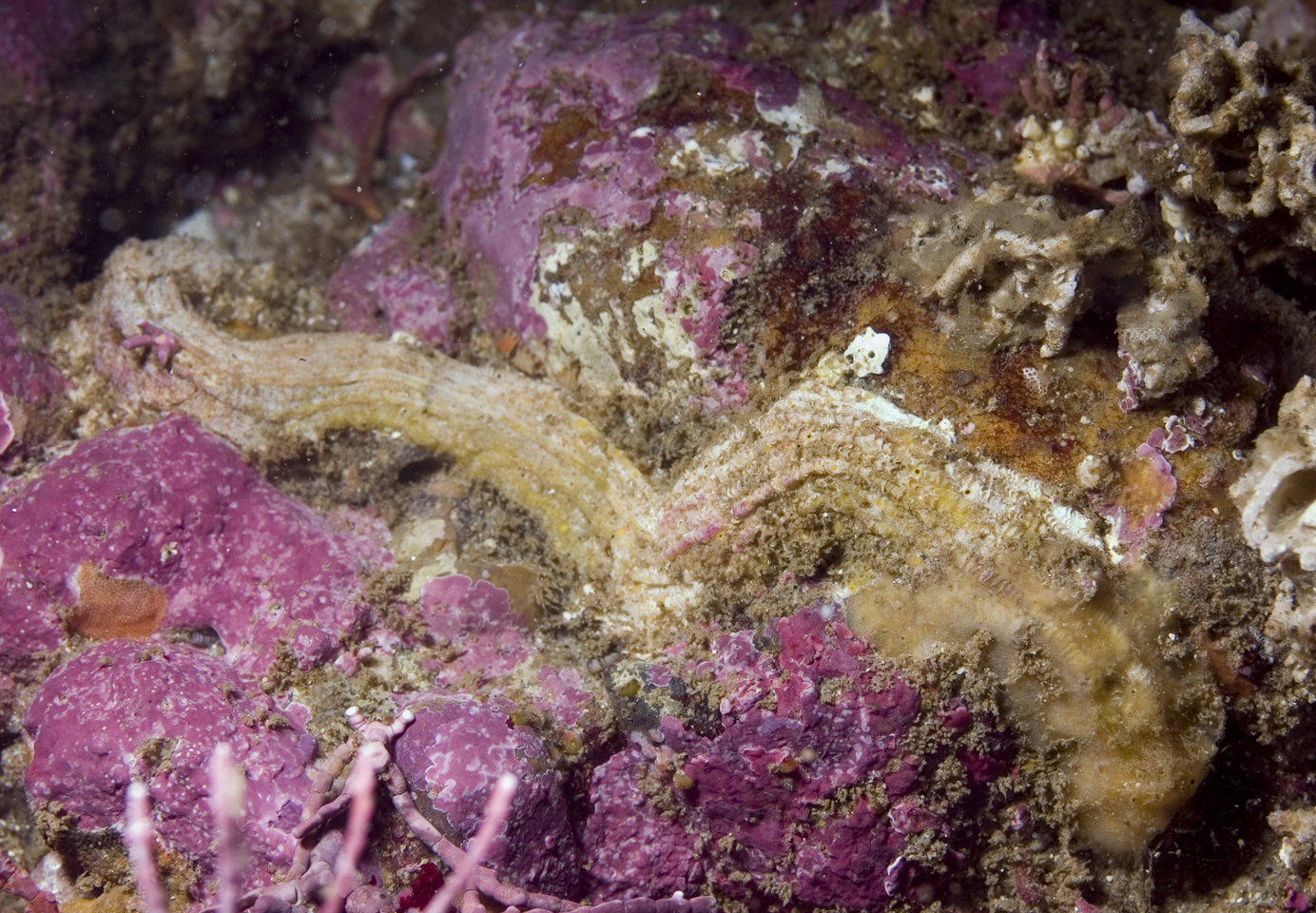
- A live individual of Thylacodes squamigerus in situ

Scientific classification
- Kingdom: Animalia
- Phylum: Mollusca
- Class: Gastropoda
- Subclass: Caenogastropoda
- Order: Littorinimorpha
- Superfamily: Vermetoidea
- Family: Vermetidae; Rafinesque

Genera
- See text

= Vermetidae =

Family of gastropods

The Vermetidae, the worm snails or worm shells, are a taxonomic family of small to medium-sized sea snails, marine gastropod molluscs in the clade Littorinimorpha. The shells of species in the family Vermetidae are extremely irregular, and do not resemble the average snail shell, hence the common name "worm shells" or "worm snails".

These snails usually grow cemented onto a hard surface, or cemented together in colonies.

== Shell description ==
These snails do not have typical regularly coiled gastropod shells; instead, they have very irregular elongated tubular shells which are moulded to, and cemented to, a surface of attachment such as a rock or another shell. In the adult, the apertural part of the shell is usually free, with the opening directed upward. Some species have an operculum and some do not. Damaged sections of the shell can be sealed off by calcareous septa when necessary.

Some vermetids are solitary, whereas others live in colonies, partially cemented together. The shells of species within this family vary greatly and can sometimes be extremely challenging to identify.

== Comparison with annelid worm tubes ==
The empty calcareous tubes of certain marine annelid tube worms, for example the Serpulidae, can sometimes be casually misidentified as empty vermetid shells, and vice versa. The difference is that vermetid shells are shiny inside and have three shell layers, whereas the annelid worm tubes are dull inside and have only two shell layers.

== Taxonomy ==
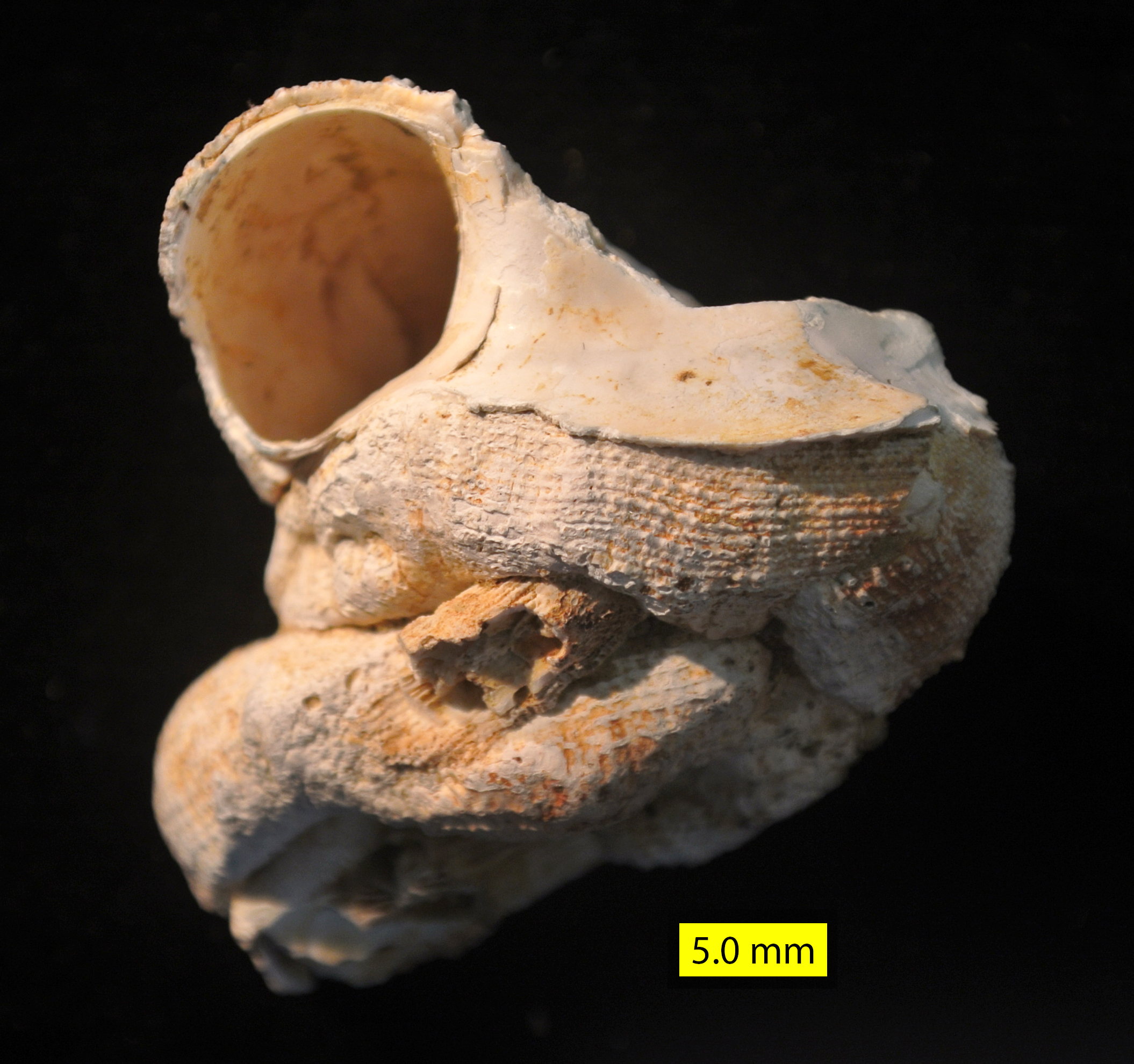
Fossil Vermetus sp.; Nicosia Formation; Pliocene; Cyprus

=== 2005 taxonomy ===
The Vermetidae were recognized as the only family in the superfamily Vermetoidea in the taxonomy of Bouchet & Rocroi (2005) within the clade Littorinimorpha.

The following two subfamilies were recognized in the taxonomy of Bouchet & Rocroi (2005):

Family Vermetidae Rafinesque, 1815

- Subfamily Vermetinae Rafinesque, 1815
- Subfamily Dendropomatinae Bandel & Kowalke, 1997

This classification of the Vermetoidea has been somewhat controversial. Studies, based on sperm ultrastructure, and on molecular data clearly place it within the clade Littorinimorpha. However, there are still a number of authors that place it within the superfamily Cerithioidea. The genera Campanile and Thylacodes form a clade that is sister to the Cerithioidea, as shown in a study by Lydeard et al. (2002).

=== 2006 taxonomy ===
Bandel (2006) established a new subfamily Laxispirinae as one of three subfamilies he recognized within the Vermetidae:

- Subfamily Vermetinae Rafinesque, 1815
- Subfamily † Laxispirinae Bandel, 2006
- Subfamily Dendropomatinae Bandel & Kowalke, 1997

== Genera ==
Genera within the family Vermetidae include:

Vermetinae

- Vermetus Daudin, 1800 - type genus
- Cerithiovermetus Bandel, 2006

† Laxispirinae

- † Laxispira Gabb, 1877 - Late Cretaceous, type genus of the subfamily

Dendropomatinae

- Dendropoma Mörch, 1861 - type genus of the subfamily

Subfamily ?

- Bivonia Gray, 1842: synonym of Dendropoma Mörch, 1861 (junior homonym of Bivonia Cocco, 1832 in Crustacea)
- Ceraesignum Golding, Bieler, Rawlings & T. Collins, 2014
- Cupolaconcha Golding, Bieler, Rawlings & T. M. Collins, 2014
- Eualetes Keen, 1971
- Magilina Vélain, 1877
- Novastoa Finlay, 1926
- Petaloconchus I. Lea, 1843
- Spiroglyptus Daudin, 1800
- Stephopoma Mörch, 1860
- Thylacodes Guettard, 1770, = Serpulorbis Sassi, 1827
- Thylaeodus Mörch, 1860
- Tripsycha Keen, 1961
- Vermitoma Kuroda, 1928
