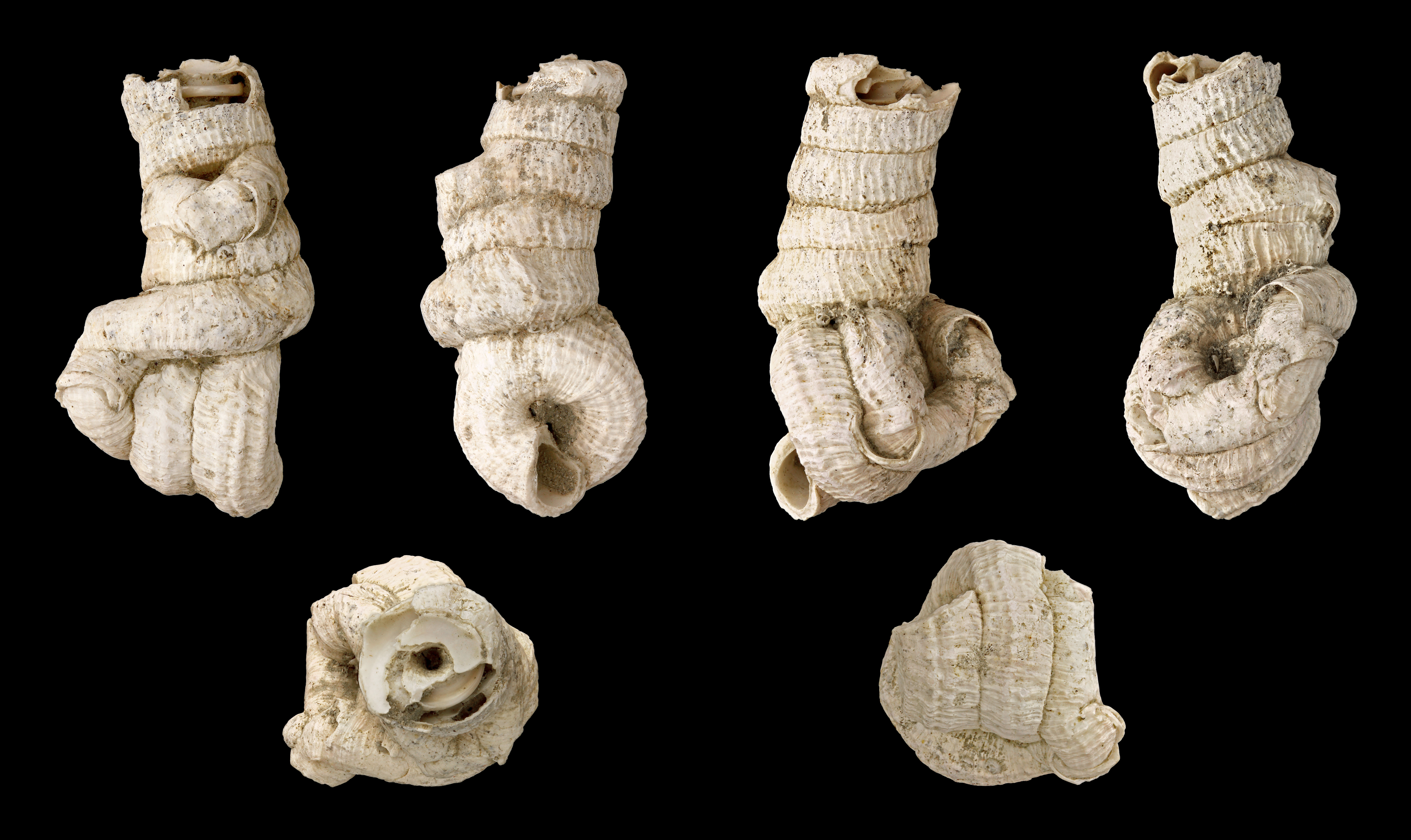
- Petaloconchus intortus (Lamarck, 1818)

Scientific classification
- Kingdom: Animalia
- Phylum: Mollusca
- Class: Gastropoda
- Subclass: Caenogastropoda
- Order: Littorinimorpha
- Superfamily: Vermetoidea
- Family: Vermetidae
- Genus: Petaloconchus; Lea, 1843

Type species
- † Petaloconchus sculpturatus H. C. Lea, 1843

Synonyms
- Macrophragma Carpenter, 1857; Petaloconchus (Macrophragma) Carpenter, 1857· accepted, alternate representation; Thylacodus Mörch, 1860; Vermetus (Petaloconchus) H. C. Lea, 1843

= Petaloconchus =

Genus of gastropods

Petaloconchus is a genus of sea snails, marine gastropod mollusks in the family Vermetidae, the worm snails or worm shells.

== Species ==
Species within the genus Petaloconchus include:

- Petaloconchus apakadikike W. C. Kelly, 2007
- Petaloconchus caperatus (Tate & May, 1900)
- Petaloconchus cereus Carpenter, 1857
- Petaloconchus cochlidium Carpenter, 1857
- Petaloconchus compactus (Carpenter, 1864)
- Petaloconchus complicatus Dall, 1908
- Petaloconchus erectus (Dall, 1888)
- Petaloconchus flavescens Carpenter, 1857
- Petaloconchus floridanus Olsson & Harbison, 1953
- Petaloconchus glomeratus (Linnaeus, 1758)
- Petaloconchus innumerabilis Pilsbry & Olsson, 1935
- Petaloconchus interliratus Stearns, 1893
- Petaloconchus intortus (Lamarck, 1818)
- Petaloconchus keenae Hadfield & Kay, 1972
- Petaloconchus lamellosus Ladd, 1972
- Petaloconchus laurae Scuderi, 2012
- Petaloconchus lilacinus (Mörch, 1862)
- Petaloconchus lilandikike W. C. Kelly, 2007
- Petaloconchus macrophragma Carpenter, 1857
- Petaloconchus mcgintyi Olsson & Harbison, 1953
- Petaloconchus merkana Ladd, 1972
- Petaloconchus montereyensis Dall, 1919
- Petaloconchus myrakeenae Absalão & Rios, 1987
- Petaloconchus nerinaeoides Carpenter, 1857
- Petaloconchus nigricans (Dall, 1884)
- Petaloconchus octosectus Carpenter, 1857
- Petaloconchus pachylasma (Mörch, 1862)
- Petaloconchus renisectus Carpenter, 1857
- † Petaloconchus sculpturatus H. C. Lea, 1843
- Petaloconchus tokyoensis (Pilsbry, 1895)
- Petaloconchus varians (d'Orbigny, 1839)≤

Species brought into synonymy

- Petaloconchus adansoni (Daudin, 1800): synonym of Vermetus adansonii Daudin, 1800 (incorrect generic placement)
- Petaloconchus annulatus (Yokoyama, 1924): synonym of Vermetus annulatus Yokoyama, 1924
- Petaloconchus floridana [sic]: synonym of Petaloconchus floridanus Olsson & Harbison, 1953 (incorrect gender ending)
