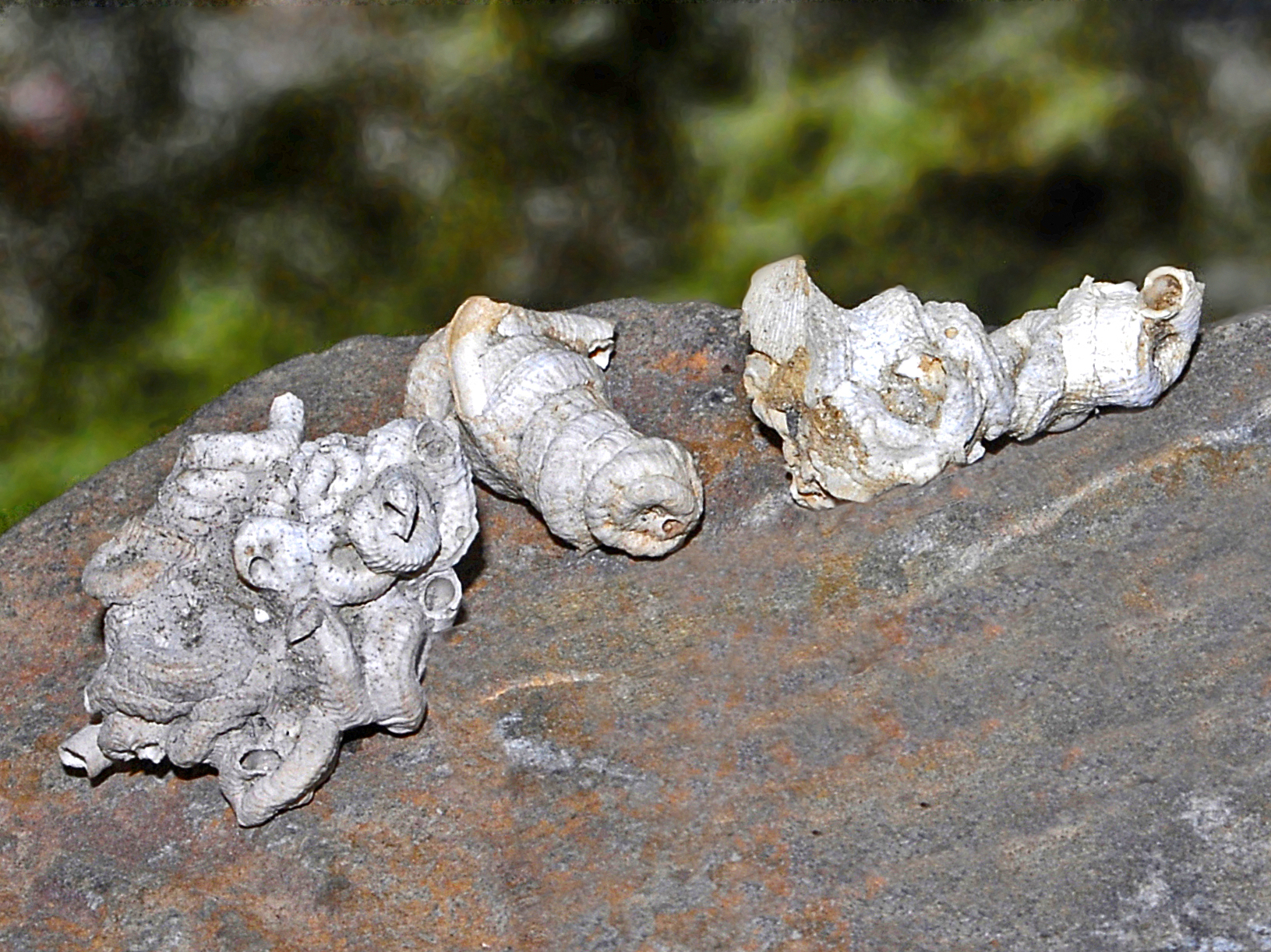
- Fossils of Petaloconchus glomeratus from Quaternary of Italy

Scientific classification
- Kingdom: Animalia
- Phylum: Mollusca
- Class: Gastropoda
- Subclass: Caenogastropoda
- Order: Littorinimorpha
- Family: Vermetidae
- Genus: Petaloconchus
- Species: P. glomeratus

Binomial name
- Petaloconchus glomeratus (Linnaeus, 1758)

Synonyms
- Serpula conglomerata Linnaeus, 1758; Serpula glomerata Linnaeus, 1758; Vermetus gregarius f. solitarius Monterosato, 1892 (junior primary homonym); Vermetus intortus Weinkauff, 1868 (synonym); 'Vermetus subcancellatus Bivona-Bernardi, 1832; Vermetus subcancellatus f. cylindratus Monterosato, 1892; Vermetus subcancellatus f. intortiformis Monterosato, 1892; Vermetus subcancellatus f. solitarius Monterosato, 1892; Vermetus subcancellatus f. trichus Monterosato, 1892; Vermetus subcancellatus f. tubulosus Monterosato, 1892; Vermetus subcancellatus f. vermiculina Monterosato, 1892; Vermetus subcancellatus var. albina Monterosato, 1892; Vermetus subcancellatus var. albinus Monterosato, 1884; Vermetus subcancellatus var. cylindrata Monterosato, 1892; Vermetus subcancellatus var. intortiformis Monterosato, 1892; Vermetus subcancellatus var. minor Monterosato, 1884; Vermetus subcancellatus var. solitaria Monterosato, 1892; Vermetus subcancellatus var. soluta Monterosato, 1884; Vermetus subcancellatus var. tricha Monterosato, 1892; Vermetus subcancellatus var. tubulosa Monterosato, 1892; Vermetus subcancellatus var. vermiculina Monterosato, 1892

= Petaloconchus glomeratus =

Species of gastropod

Petaloconchus glomeratus is a species of sea snail, a marine gastropod mollusk in the family Vermetidae, the worm snails or worm shells.

== Description ==
Shells of Petaloconchus glomeratus can reach a size of 2–7 millimetres (0.079–0.276 in). They are elongated, tubular, and extremely irregular. These "worm shells" usually grow cemented in colonies onto a hard substrate.

== Distribution ==
This species is present in the Mediterranean Sea - Eastern Basin and in North Atlantic Ocean.
