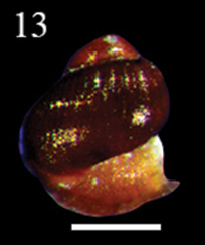
- Petaloconchus mcgintyi, ventral view, scale bar 0.25 mm.

Scientific classification
- Kingdom: Animalia
- Phylum: Mollusca
- Class: Gastropoda
- Subclass: Caenogastropoda
- Order: Littorinimorpha
- Family: Vermetidae
- Genus: Petaloconchus
- Species: P. mcgintyi

Binomial name
- Petaloconchus mcgintyi Olsson & Harbison, 1953

= Petaloconchus mcgintyi =

Species of gastropod

Petaloconchus mcgintyi is a species of sea snail, a marine gastropod mollusk in the family Vermetidae, the worm snails or worm shells.

== Description ==
The maximum recorded shell length is 35 mm.

== Habitat ==
Minimum recorded depth is 2 m. Maximum recorded depth is 61 m.
