= Petaloconchus keenae =

Scientific classification
- Kingdom: Animalia
- Phylum: Mollusca
- Class: Gastropoda
- Subclass: Caenogastropoda
- Order: Littorinimorpha
- Family: Vermetidae
- Genus: Petaloconchus
- Species: P. keenae

Binomial name
- Petaloconchus keenae M. G. Hadfield & Kay, 1972

Species of snail

Petaloconchus keenae is a worm snail common in intertidal and subtidal areas in Hawaiʻi and the tropical Pacific.

== Distribution ==
It can be found in the Central Pacific: Guam and Hawaii.

== Description ==
Petaloconchus keenae have typically coiled adult shells as seen on smooth surfaces and irregularly coiled adult shells. The shell harbors in the anterior part of the relatively small soft body, which is able to retreat wholly in the shell. The operculum is smaller than the aperture. Petaloconchus keenae can have a body length of up to 42mm and their body volume can reach to 6.56 cm^{3}.
