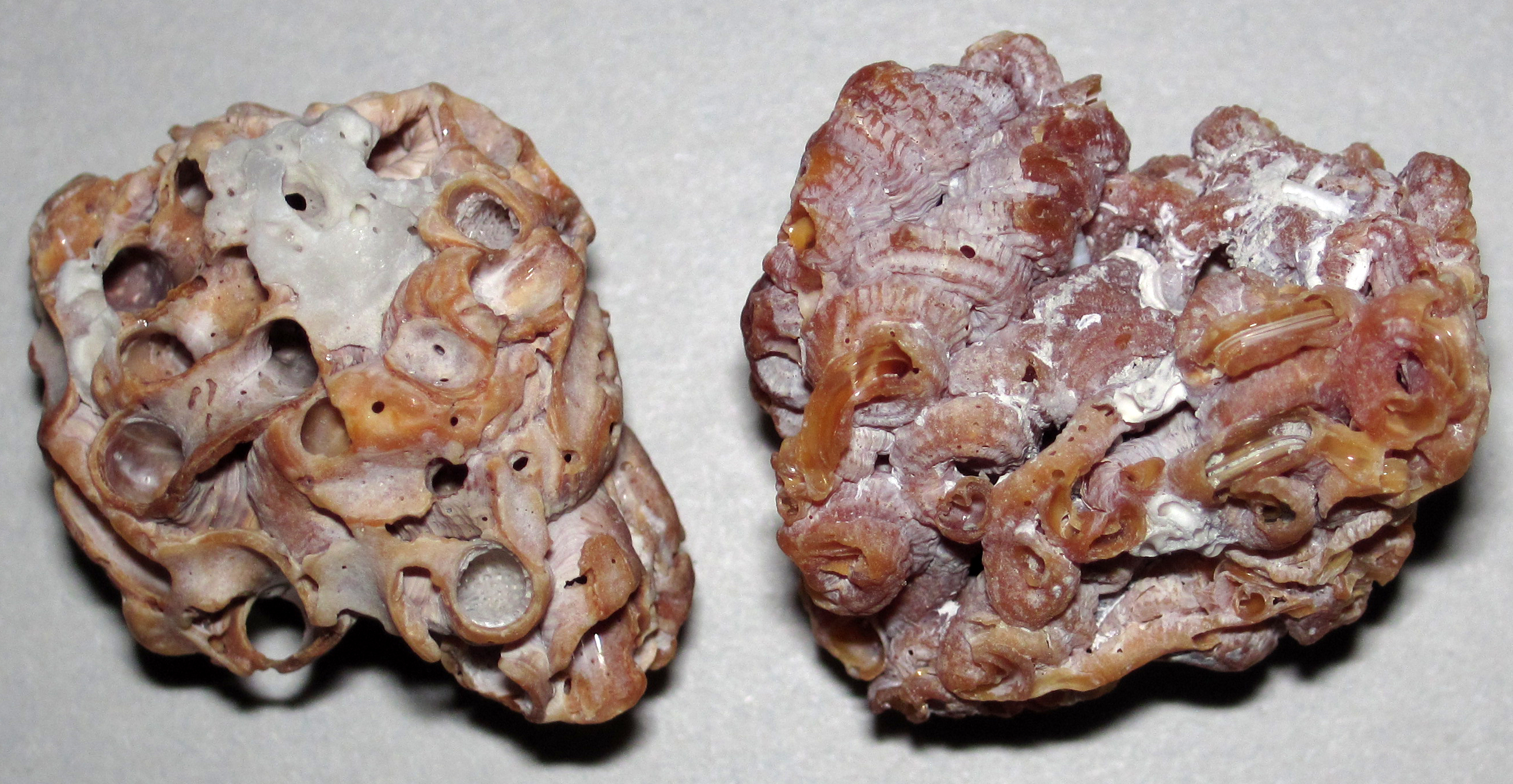
- Encrusted colonies

Scientific classification
- Kingdom: Animalia
- Phylum: Mollusca
- Class: Gastropoda
- Subclass: Caenogastropoda
- Order: Littorinimorpha
- Family: Vermetidae
- Genus: Petaloconchus
- Species: P. varians

Binomial name
- Petaloconchus varians (d’Orbigny, 1839)

= Petaloconchus varians =

Species of gastropod

Petaloconchus varians is a species of sea snail, a marine gastropod mollusk in the family Vermetidae, the worm snails or worm shells.

== Description ==
The maximum recorded shell length is 200 mm.
