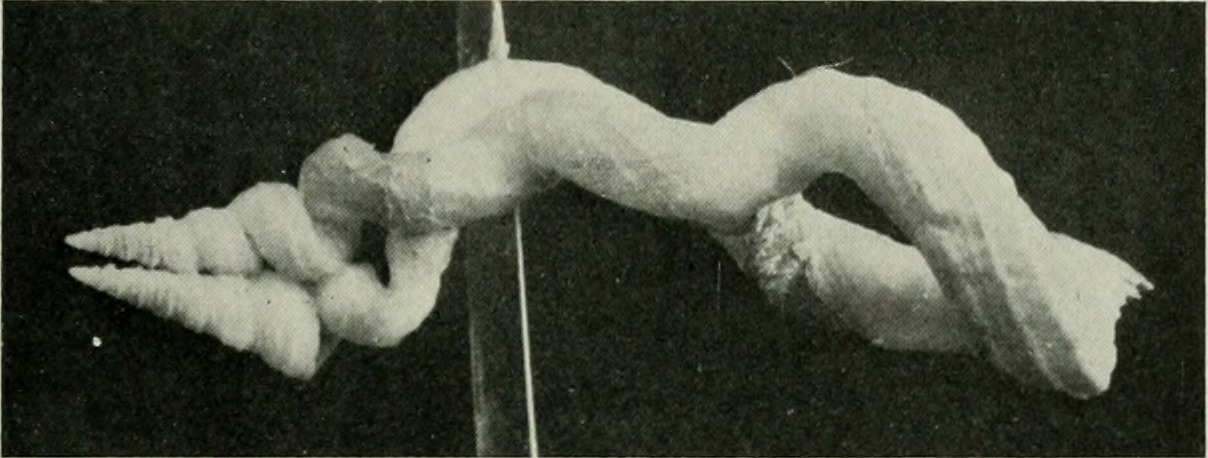

Scientific classification
- Kingdom: Animalia
- Phylum: Mollusca
- Class: Gastropoda
- Subclass: Caenogastropoda
- Order: Littorinimorpha
- Family: Vermetidae
- Genus: Petaloconchus
- Species: P. nigricans

Binomial name
- Petaloconchus nigricans (Dall, 1884)

= Petaloconchus nigricans =

Species of gastropod

Petaloconchus nigricans is a species of sea snail, a marine gastropod mollusk in the family Vermetidae, the worm snails or worm shells.

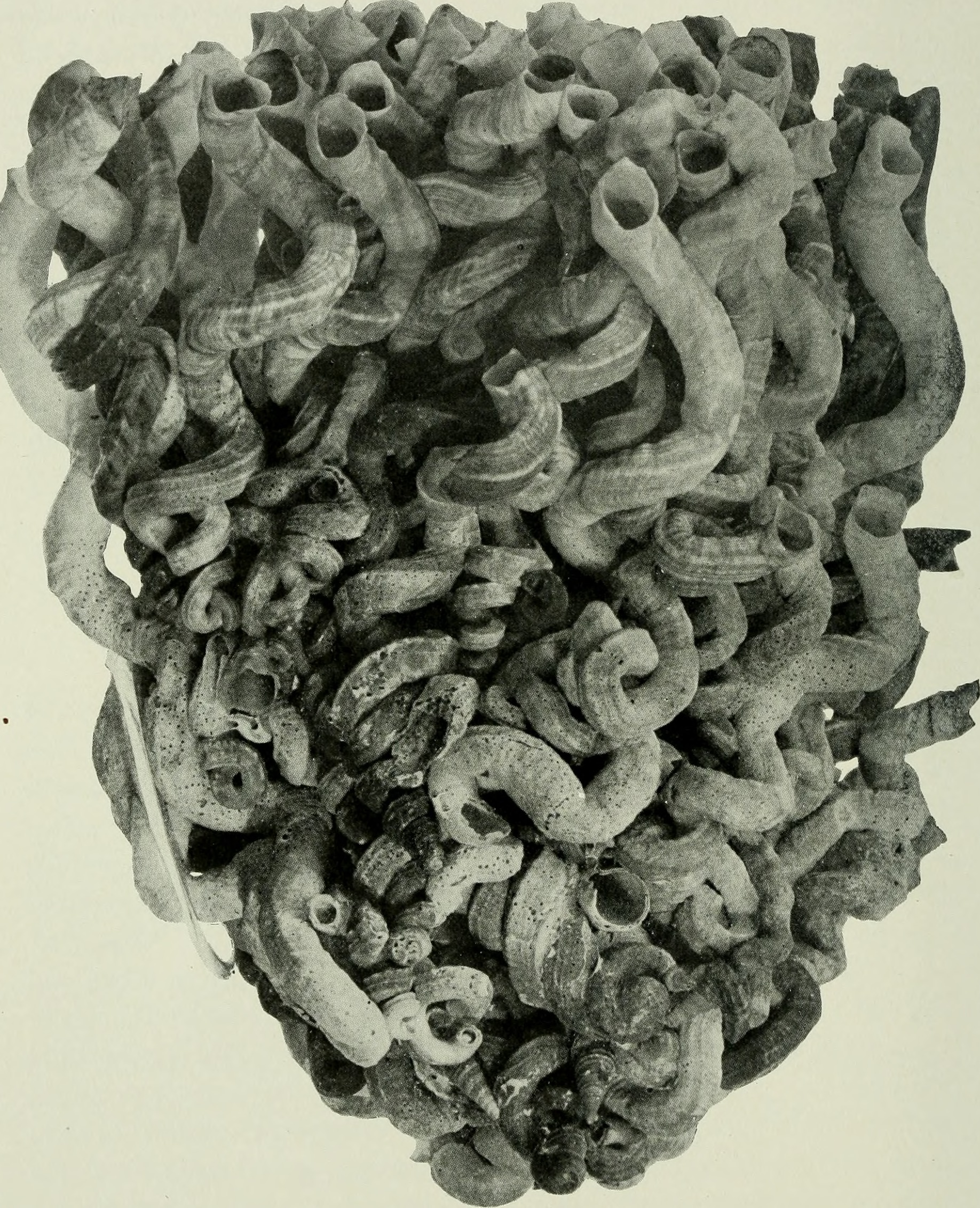

== Description ==
The maximum recorded shell length is 60 mm.
