= Petaloconchus interliratus =

Scientific classification
- Kingdom: Animalia
- Phylum: Mollusca
- Class: Gastropoda
- Subclass: Caenogastropoda
- Order: Littorinimorpha
- Family: Vermetidae
- Genus: Petaloconchus
- Species: P. interliratus

Binomial name
- Petaloconchus interliratus Stearns, 1893

Species of gastropod

Petaloconchus interliratus is a species of sea snail, a marine gastropod mollusc in the family Vermetidae, the worm snails or worm shells.
