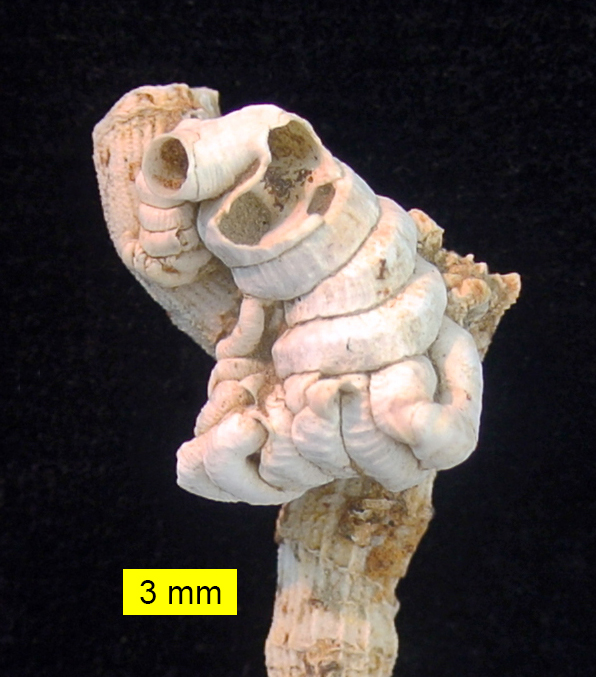
- Petaloconchus intortus (Nicosia Formation, Pliocene, Cyptrus)

Scientific classification
- Kingdom: Animalia
- Phylum: Mollusca
- Class: Gastropoda
- Subclass: Caenogastropoda
- Order: Littorinimorpha
- Family: Vermetidae
- Genus: Petaloconchus
- Species: P. intortus

Binomial name
- Petaloconchus intortus (Valenciennes, 1818)

Synonyms
- † Serpula intorta Lamarck, 1818 (superseded original combination, and transfer to Mollusca); † Vermilia intorta Lamarck, 1818 (superseded subsequent combination, and transfer to Mollusca)

= Petaloconchus intortus =

Species of gastropod

Petaloconchus intortus is an extinct species of sea snail, a marine gastropod mollusc in the family Vermetidae, the worm snails or worm shells.

== Distribution ==
Fossils of this species were found in Southern France.
